

170001–170100 

|-bgcolor=#E9E9E9
| 170001 ||  || — || October 10, 2002 || Socorro || LINEAR || — || align=right | 1.9 km || 
|-id=002 bgcolor=#E9E9E9
| 170002 ||  || — || October 10, 2002 || Socorro || LINEAR || GEF || align=right | 2.8 km || 
|-id=003 bgcolor=#E9E9E9
| 170003 ||  || — || October 10, 2002 || Socorro || LINEAR || — || align=right | 5.3 km || 
|-id=004 bgcolor=#E9E9E9
| 170004 ||  || — || October 11, 2002 || Socorro || LINEAR || AGN || align=right | 1.7 km || 
|-id=005 bgcolor=#E9E9E9
| 170005 ||  || — || October 11, 2002 || Socorro || LINEAR || HOF || align=right | 3.6 km || 
|-id=006 bgcolor=#d6d6d6
| 170006 Stoughton ||  ||  || October 4, 2002 || Apache Point || SDSS || — || align=right | 3.8 km || 
|-id=007 bgcolor=#E9E9E9
| 170007 Strateva ||  ||  || October 5, 2002 || Apache Point || SDSS || — || align=right | 2.1 km || 
|-id=008 bgcolor=#E9E9E9
| 170008 Michaelstrauss ||  ||  || October 5, 2002 || Apache Point || SDSS || — || align=right | 3.7 km || 
|-id=009 bgcolor=#d6d6d6
| 170009 Subbarao ||  ||  || October 5, 2002 || Apache Point || SDSS || — || align=right | 3.1 km || 
|-id=010 bgcolor=#E9E9E9
| 170010 Szalay ||  ||  || October 5, 2002 || Apache Point || SDSS || NEM || align=right | 3.0 km || 
|-id=011 bgcolor=#E9E9E9
| 170011 Szkody ||  ||  || October 10, 2002 || Apache Point || SDSS || — || align=right | 3.7 km || 
|-id=012 bgcolor=#E9E9E9
| 170012 Anithakar ||  ||  || October 10, 2002 || Apache Point || SDSS || — || align=right | 3.4 km || 
|-id=013 bgcolor=#FFC2E0
| 170013 ||  || — || October 28, 2002 || Socorro || LINEAR || APO +1km || align=right | 1.0 km || 
|-id=014 bgcolor=#E9E9E9
| 170014 ||  || — || October 26, 2002 || Haleakala || NEAT || — || align=right | 2.4 km || 
|-id=015 bgcolor=#E9E9E9
| 170015 ||  || — || October 28, 2002 || Palomar || NEAT || CLO || align=right | 4.3 km || 
|-id=016 bgcolor=#E9E9E9
| 170016 ||  || — || October 28, 2002 || Kvistaberg || UDAS || AGN || align=right | 1.8 km || 
|-id=017 bgcolor=#d6d6d6
| 170017 ||  || — || October 30, 2002 || Haleakala || NEAT || — || align=right | 6.4 km || 
|-id=018 bgcolor=#E9E9E9
| 170018 ||  || — || October 28, 2002 || Palomar || NEAT || — || align=right | 3.9 km || 
|-id=019 bgcolor=#d6d6d6
| 170019 ||  || — || October 28, 2002 || Palomar || NEAT || CHA || align=right | 4.3 km || 
|-id=020 bgcolor=#d6d6d6
| 170020 ||  || — || October 28, 2002 || Palomar || NEAT || — || align=right | 4.0 km || 
|-id=021 bgcolor=#E9E9E9
| 170021 ||  || — || October 31, 2002 || Palomar || NEAT || — || align=right | 3.1 km || 
|-id=022 bgcolor=#d6d6d6
| 170022 Douglastucker ||  ||  || October 30, 2002 || Apache Point || SDSS || KOR || align=right | 1.9 km || 
|-id=023 bgcolor=#E9E9E9
| 170023 Vogeley ||  ||  || October 30, 2002 || Apache Point || SDSS || AGN || align=right | 1.9 km || 
|-id=024 bgcolor=#d6d6d6
| 170024 || 2002 VH || — || November 1, 2002 || Socorro || LINEAR || — || align=right | 4.8 km || 
|-id=025 bgcolor=#d6d6d6
| 170025 || 2002 VO || — || November 2, 2002 || Wrightwood || J. W. Young || — || align=right | 3.9 km || 
|-id=026 bgcolor=#d6d6d6
| 170026 ||  || — || November 4, 2002 || Wrightwood || J. W. Young || — || align=right | 4.8 km || 
|-id=027 bgcolor=#d6d6d6
| 170027 ||  || — || November 5, 2002 || Wrightwood || J. W. Young || — || align=right | 3.7 km || 
|-id=028 bgcolor=#d6d6d6
| 170028 ||  || — || November 1, 2002 || Palomar || NEAT || — || align=right | 5.1 km || 
|-id=029 bgcolor=#E9E9E9
| 170029 ||  || — || November 1, 2002 || Palomar || NEAT || RAF || align=right | 4.6 km || 
|-id=030 bgcolor=#d6d6d6
| 170030 ||  || — || November 1, 2002 || Palomar || NEAT || TEL || align=right | 2.5 km || 
|-id=031 bgcolor=#d6d6d6
| 170031 ||  || — || November 5, 2002 || Socorro || LINEAR || — || align=right | 5.7 km || 
|-id=032 bgcolor=#d6d6d6
| 170032 ||  || — || November 5, 2002 || Socorro || LINEAR || EOS || align=right | 4.1 km || 
|-id=033 bgcolor=#d6d6d6
| 170033 ||  || — || November 5, 2002 || Socorro || LINEAR || — || align=right | 3.8 km || 
|-id=034 bgcolor=#d6d6d6
| 170034 ||  || — || November 5, 2002 || Socorro || LINEAR || — || align=right | 3.5 km || 
|-id=035 bgcolor=#d6d6d6
| 170035 ||  || — || November 5, 2002 || Anderson Mesa || LONEOS || — || align=right | 4.0 km || 
|-id=036 bgcolor=#E9E9E9
| 170036 ||  || — || November 5, 2002 || Socorro || LINEAR || — || align=right | 4.0 km || 
|-id=037 bgcolor=#d6d6d6
| 170037 ||  || — || November 5, 2002 || Socorro || LINEAR || — || align=right | 6.7 km || 
|-id=038 bgcolor=#d6d6d6
| 170038 ||  || — || November 5, 2002 || Socorro || LINEAR || — || align=right | 5.2 km || 
|-id=039 bgcolor=#d6d6d6
| 170039 ||  || — || November 5, 2002 || Socorro || LINEAR || — || align=right | 7.1 km || 
|-id=040 bgcolor=#d6d6d6
| 170040 ||  || — || November 5, 2002 || Kitt Peak || Spacewatch || — || align=right | 4.6 km || 
|-id=041 bgcolor=#d6d6d6
| 170041 ||  || — || November 5, 2002 || Anderson Mesa || LONEOS || — || align=right | 5.2 km || 
|-id=042 bgcolor=#E9E9E9
| 170042 ||  || — || November 4, 2002 || Palomar || NEAT || WIT || align=right | 1.6 km || 
|-id=043 bgcolor=#E9E9E9
| 170043 ||  || — || November 5, 2002 || Palomar || NEAT || GEF || align=right | 1.9 km || 
|-id=044 bgcolor=#E9E9E9
| 170044 ||  || — || November 4, 2002 || Palomar || NEAT || — || align=right | 5.6 km || 
|-id=045 bgcolor=#d6d6d6
| 170045 ||  || — || November 5, 2002 || Socorro || LINEAR || THM || align=right | 3.8 km || 
|-id=046 bgcolor=#E9E9E9
| 170046 ||  || — || November 5, 2002 || Anderson Mesa || LONEOS || — || align=right | 4.6 km || 
|-id=047 bgcolor=#E9E9E9
| 170047 ||  || — || November 6, 2002 || Anderson Mesa || LONEOS || — || align=right | 3.9 km || 
|-id=048 bgcolor=#E9E9E9
| 170048 ||  || — || November 6, 2002 || Socorro || LINEAR || — || align=right | 2.7 km || 
|-id=049 bgcolor=#d6d6d6
| 170049 ||  || — || November 6, 2002 || Anderson Mesa || LONEOS || EOS || align=right | 3.2 km || 
|-id=050 bgcolor=#E9E9E9
| 170050 ||  || — || November 6, 2002 || Socorro || LINEAR || — || align=right | 2.6 km || 
|-id=051 bgcolor=#d6d6d6
| 170051 ||  || — || November 6, 2002 || Haleakala || NEAT || — || align=right | 4.0 km || 
|-id=052 bgcolor=#d6d6d6
| 170052 ||  || — || November 3, 2002 || Haleakala || NEAT || — || align=right | 3.9 km || 
|-id=053 bgcolor=#E9E9E9
| 170053 ||  || — || November 7, 2002 || Socorro || LINEAR || AGN || align=right | 2.4 km || 
|-id=054 bgcolor=#d6d6d6
| 170054 ||  || — || November 7, 2002 || Socorro || LINEAR || EOS || align=right | 3.7 km || 
|-id=055 bgcolor=#d6d6d6
| 170055 ||  || — || November 7, 2002 || Socorro || LINEAR || ARM || align=right | 6.1 km || 
|-id=056 bgcolor=#d6d6d6
| 170056 ||  || — || November 7, 2002 || Socorro || LINEAR || HYG || align=right | 5.1 km || 
|-id=057 bgcolor=#d6d6d6
| 170057 ||  || — || November 7, 2002 || Socorro || LINEAR || EOS || align=right | 4.4 km || 
|-id=058 bgcolor=#d6d6d6
| 170058 ||  || — || November 7, 2002 || Socorro || LINEAR || — || align=right | 5.7 km || 
|-id=059 bgcolor=#d6d6d6
| 170059 ||  || — || November 7, 2002 || Socorro || LINEAR || — || align=right | 4.5 km || 
|-id=060 bgcolor=#d6d6d6
| 170060 ||  || — || November 7, 2002 || Socorro || LINEAR || — || align=right | 5.3 km || 
|-id=061 bgcolor=#E9E9E9
| 170061 ||  || — || November 7, 2002 || Socorro || LINEAR || — || align=right | 5.1 km || 
|-id=062 bgcolor=#d6d6d6
| 170062 ||  || — || November 10, 2002 || Socorro || LINEAR || — || align=right | 5.5 km || 
|-id=063 bgcolor=#E9E9E9
| 170063 ||  || — || November 11, 2002 || Socorro || LINEAR || — || align=right | 3.8 km || 
|-id=064 bgcolor=#d6d6d6
| 170064 ||  || — || November 11, 2002 || Socorro || LINEAR || — || align=right | 3.4 km || 
|-id=065 bgcolor=#d6d6d6
| 170065 ||  || — || November 11, 2002 || Anderson Mesa || LONEOS || — || align=right | 5.6 km || 
|-id=066 bgcolor=#d6d6d6
| 170066 ||  || — || November 12, 2002 || Socorro || LINEAR || URS || align=right | 5.1 km || 
|-id=067 bgcolor=#d6d6d6
| 170067 ||  || — || November 12, 2002 || Socorro || LINEAR || EOS || align=right | 3.6 km || 
|-id=068 bgcolor=#d6d6d6
| 170068 ||  || — || November 12, 2002 || Palomar || NEAT || — || align=right | 4.0 km || 
|-id=069 bgcolor=#d6d6d6
| 170069 ||  || — || November 12, 2002 || Palomar || NEAT || EOS || align=right | 3.6 km || 
|-id=070 bgcolor=#E9E9E9
| 170070 ||  || — || November 12, 2002 || Palomar || NEAT || GEF || align=right | 2.1 km || 
|-id=071 bgcolor=#E9E9E9
| 170071 ||  || — || November 12, 2002 || Anderson Mesa || LONEOS || — || align=right | 3.3 km || 
|-id=072 bgcolor=#d6d6d6
| 170072 ||  || — || November 14, 2002 || Emerald Lane || L. Ball || — || align=right | 5.2 km || 
|-id=073 bgcolor=#E9E9E9
| 170073 Ivanlinscott ||  ||  || November 9, 2002 || Kitt Peak || M. W. Buie || — || align=right | 4.1 km || 
|-id=074 bgcolor=#d6d6d6
| 170074 ||  || — || November 5, 2002 || Nyukasa || Mount Nyukasa Stn. || — || align=right | 2.9 km || 
|-id=075 bgcolor=#d6d6d6
| 170075 ||  || — || November 12, 2002 || Palomar || NEAT || — || align=right | 5.6 km || 
|-id=076 bgcolor=#d6d6d6
| 170076 ||  || — || November 23, 2002 || Palomar || NEAT || — || align=right | 3.2 km || 
|-id=077 bgcolor=#d6d6d6
| 170077 ||  || — || November 24, 2002 || Palomar || NEAT || HYG || align=right | 3.8 km || 
|-id=078 bgcolor=#E9E9E9
| 170078 ||  || — || November 24, 2002 || Palomar || NEAT || — || align=right | 3.8 km || 
|-id=079 bgcolor=#E9E9E9
| 170079 ||  || — || November 24, 2002 || Palomar || NEAT || — || align=right | 3.8 km || 
|-id=080 bgcolor=#d6d6d6
| 170080 ||  || — || November 24, 2002 || Palomar || NEAT || EOS || align=right | 4.1 km || 
|-id=081 bgcolor=#d6d6d6
| 170081 ||  || — || November 24, 2002 || Palomar || NEAT || — || align=right | 4.3 km || 
|-id=082 bgcolor=#d6d6d6
| 170082 ||  || — || November 27, 2002 || Anderson Mesa || LONEOS || — || align=right | 5.1 km || 
|-id=083 bgcolor=#d6d6d6
| 170083 ||  || — || November 28, 2002 || Haleakala || NEAT || — || align=right | 3.9 km || 
|-id=084 bgcolor=#d6d6d6
| 170084 ||  || — || November 28, 2002 || Haleakala || NEAT || — || align=right | 5.3 km || 
|-id=085 bgcolor=#d6d6d6
| 170085 ||  || — || December 1, 2002 || Socorro || LINEAR || EMA || align=right | 6.0 km || 
|-id=086 bgcolor=#FFC2E0
| 170086 ||  || — || December 5, 2002 || Socorro || LINEAR || APO +1kmPHA || align=right data-sort-value="0.93" | 930 m || 
|-id=087 bgcolor=#E9E9E9
| 170087 ||  || — || December 2, 2002 || Socorro || LINEAR || — || align=right | 4.6 km || 
|-id=088 bgcolor=#d6d6d6
| 170088 ||  || — || December 5, 2002 || Socorro || LINEAR || — || align=right | 3.1 km || 
|-id=089 bgcolor=#E9E9E9
| 170089 ||  || — || December 7, 2002 || Desert Eagle || W. K. Y. Yeung || — || align=right | 4.1 km || 
|-id=090 bgcolor=#d6d6d6
| 170090 ||  || — || December 6, 2002 || Socorro || LINEAR || — || align=right | 4.0 km || 
|-id=091 bgcolor=#d6d6d6
| 170091 ||  || — || December 10, 2002 || Socorro || LINEAR || KOR || align=right | 2.4 km || 
|-id=092 bgcolor=#E9E9E9
| 170092 ||  || — || December 10, 2002 || Palomar || NEAT || — || align=right | 2.0 km || 
|-id=093 bgcolor=#d6d6d6
| 170093 ||  || — || December 9, 2002 || Anderson Mesa || LONEOS || — || align=right | 5.6 km || 
|-id=094 bgcolor=#d6d6d6
| 170094 ||  || — || December 10, 2002 || Socorro || LINEAR || — || align=right | 3.9 km || 
|-id=095 bgcolor=#d6d6d6
| 170095 ||  || — || December 10, 2002 || Socorro || LINEAR || — || align=right | 5.7 km || 
|-id=096 bgcolor=#d6d6d6
| 170096 ||  || — || December 11, 2002 || Socorro || LINEAR || — || align=right | 5.5 km || 
|-id=097 bgcolor=#d6d6d6
| 170097 ||  || — || December 10, 2002 || Socorro || LINEAR || EOS || align=right | 3.8 km || 
|-id=098 bgcolor=#d6d6d6
| 170098 ||  || — || December 11, 2002 || Socorro || LINEAR || — || align=right | 3.8 km || 
|-id=099 bgcolor=#d6d6d6
| 170099 ||  || — || December 11, 2002 || Socorro || LINEAR || EOS || align=right | 3.6 km || 
|-id=100 bgcolor=#d6d6d6
| 170100 ||  || — || December 10, 2002 || Socorro || LINEAR || EOS || align=right | 3.8 km || 
|}

170101–170200 

|-bgcolor=#d6d6d6
| 170101 ||  || — || December 10, 2002 || Socorro || LINEAR || — || align=right | 5.2 km || 
|-id=102 bgcolor=#d6d6d6
| 170102 ||  || — || December 11, 2002 || Socorro || LINEAR || EOS || align=right | 3.7 km || 
|-id=103 bgcolor=#d6d6d6
| 170103 ||  || — || December 11, 2002 || Socorro || LINEAR || — || align=right | 8.0 km || 
|-id=104 bgcolor=#d6d6d6
| 170104 ||  || — || December 11, 2002 || Socorro || LINEAR || — || align=right | 6.5 km || 
|-id=105 bgcolor=#d6d6d6
| 170105 ||  || — || December 11, 2002 || Socorro || LINEAR || — || align=right | 5.0 km || 
|-id=106 bgcolor=#d6d6d6
| 170106 ||  || — || December 12, 2002 || Palomar || NEAT || — || align=right | 4.7 km || 
|-id=107 bgcolor=#d6d6d6
| 170107 ||  || — || December 12, 2002 || Palomar || NEAT || — || align=right | 5.6 km || 
|-id=108 bgcolor=#d6d6d6
| 170108 ||  || — || December 14, 2002 || Socorro || LINEAR || — || align=right | 5.0 km || 
|-id=109 bgcolor=#d6d6d6
| 170109 ||  || — || December 5, 2002 || Socorro || LINEAR || — || align=right | 5.3 km || 
|-id=110 bgcolor=#d6d6d6
| 170110 ||  || — || December 5, 2002 || Socorro || LINEAR || — || align=right | 3.6 km || 
|-id=111 bgcolor=#d6d6d6
| 170111 ||  || — || December 5, 2002 || Socorro || LINEAR || — || align=right | 5.0 km || 
|-id=112 bgcolor=#d6d6d6
| 170112 ||  || — || December 5, 2002 || Socorro || LINEAR || — || align=right | 4.5 km || 
|-id=113 bgcolor=#d6d6d6
| 170113 ||  || — || December 5, 2002 || Socorro || LINEAR || EOS || align=right | 3.4 km || 
|-id=114 bgcolor=#d6d6d6
| 170114 ||  || — || December 5, 2002 || Socorro || LINEAR || — || align=right | 4.4 km || 
|-id=115 bgcolor=#d6d6d6
| 170115 ||  || — || December 5, 2002 || Socorro || LINEAR || — || align=right | 6.2 km || 
|-id=116 bgcolor=#d6d6d6
| 170116 ||  || — || December 6, 2002 || Socorro || LINEAR || EOS || align=right | 3.0 km || 
|-id=117 bgcolor=#d6d6d6
| 170117 ||  || — || December 31, 2002 || Socorro || LINEAR || — || align=right | 4.6 km || 
|-id=118 bgcolor=#fefefe
| 170118 ||  || — || December 31, 2002 || Socorro || LINEAR || H || align=right data-sort-value="0.82" | 820 m || 
|-id=119 bgcolor=#d6d6d6
| 170119 ||  || — || December 31, 2002 || Socorro || LINEAR || EOS || align=right | 3.5 km || 
|-id=120 bgcolor=#d6d6d6
| 170120 ||  || — || December 31, 2002 || Socorro || LINEAR || — || align=right | 4.9 km || 
|-id=121 bgcolor=#d6d6d6
| 170121 ||  || — || December 31, 2002 || Socorro || LINEAR || — || align=right | 4.7 km || 
|-id=122 bgcolor=#d6d6d6
| 170122 ||  || — || December 31, 2002 || Socorro || LINEAR || — || align=right | 4.8 km || 
|-id=123 bgcolor=#d6d6d6
| 170123 ||  || — || December 27, 2002 || Palomar || NEAT || — || align=right | 5.3 km || 
|-id=124 bgcolor=#fefefe
| 170124 ||  || — || January 3, 2003 || Socorro || LINEAR || H || align=right data-sort-value="0.93" | 930 m || 
|-id=125 bgcolor=#d6d6d6
| 170125 ||  || — || January 4, 2003 || Socorro || LINEAR || — || align=right | 6.0 km || 
|-id=126 bgcolor=#d6d6d6
| 170126 ||  || — || January 4, 2003 || Socorro || LINEAR || — || align=right | 4.2 km || 
|-id=127 bgcolor=#d6d6d6
| 170127 ||  || — || January 1, 2003 || Socorro || LINEAR || EUP || align=right | 8.2 km || 
|-id=128 bgcolor=#d6d6d6
| 170128 ||  || — || January 3, 2003 || Socorro || LINEAR || — || align=right | 5.4 km || 
|-id=129 bgcolor=#d6d6d6
| 170129 ||  || — || January 4, 2003 || Socorro || LINEAR || HYG || align=right | 4.0 km || 
|-id=130 bgcolor=#E9E9E9
| 170130 ||  || — || January 5, 2003 || Socorro || LINEAR || — || align=right | 5.1 km || 
|-id=131 bgcolor=#d6d6d6
| 170131 ||  || — || January 4, 2003 || Socorro || LINEAR || — || align=right | 6.5 km || 
|-id=132 bgcolor=#d6d6d6
| 170132 ||  || — || January 4, 2003 || Socorro || LINEAR || — || align=right | 7.1 km || 
|-id=133 bgcolor=#d6d6d6
| 170133 ||  || — || January 7, 2003 || Socorro || LINEAR || — || align=right | 5.1 km || 
|-id=134 bgcolor=#d6d6d6
| 170134 ||  || — || January 5, 2003 || Socorro || LINEAR || — || align=right | 6.2 km || 
|-id=135 bgcolor=#d6d6d6
| 170135 ||  || — || January 5, 2003 || Socorro || LINEAR || — || align=right | 4.3 km || 
|-id=136 bgcolor=#d6d6d6
| 170136 ||  || — || January 8, 2003 || Socorro || LINEAR || THM || align=right | 3.7 km || 
|-id=137 bgcolor=#d6d6d6
| 170137 ||  || — || January 7, 2003 || Socorro || LINEAR || — || align=right | 5.8 km || 
|-id=138 bgcolor=#d6d6d6
| 170138 ||  || — || January 7, 2003 || Socorro || LINEAR || — || align=right | 5.5 km || 
|-id=139 bgcolor=#d6d6d6
| 170139 ||  || — || January 10, 2003 || Socorro || LINEAR || EUP || align=right | 6.7 km || 
|-id=140 bgcolor=#fefefe
| 170140 ||  || — || January 10, 2003 || Socorro || LINEAR || H || align=right | 1.3 km || 
|-id=141 bgcolor=#d6d6d6
| 170141 ||  || — || January 10, 2003 || Socorro || LINEAR || — || align=right | 5.7 km || 
|-id=142 bgcolor=#d6d6d6
| 170142 ||  || — || January 11, 2003 || Socorro || LINEAR || TIR || align=right | 4.8 km || 
|-id=143 bgcolor=#d6d6d6
| 170143 ||  || — || January 11, 2003 || Socorro || LINEAR || — || align=right | 4.4 km || 
|-id=144 bgcolor=#d6d6d6
| 170144 ||  || — || January 10, 2003 || Socorro || LINEAR || URS || align=right | 6.1 km || 
|-id=145 bgcolor=#E9E9E9
| 170145 ||  || — || January 24, 2003 || Palomar || NEAT || — || align=right | 3.8 km || 
|-id=146 bgcolor=#FA8072
| 170146 ||  || — || January 26, 2003 || Palomar || NEAT || H || align=right | 1.6 km || 
|-id=147 bgcolor=#d6d6d6
| 170147 ||  || — || January 27, 2003 || Socorro || LINEAR || — || align=right | 5.1 km || 
|-id=148 bgcolor=#d6d6d6
| 170148 ||  || — || January 26, 2003 || Kitt Peak || Spacewatch || TIR || align=right | 5.4 km || 
|-id=149 bgcolor=#d6d6d6
| 170149 ||  || — || January 26, 2003 || Haleakala || NEAT || — || align=right | 6.0 km || 
|-id=150 bgcolor=#d6d6d6
| 170150 ||  || — || January 28, 2003 || Socorro || LINEAR || — || align=right | 5.3 km || 
|-id=151 bgcolor=#fefefe
| 170151 ||  || — || February 1, 2003 || Socorro || LINEAR || H || align=right | 1.1 km || 
|-id=152 bgcolor=#d6d6d6
| 170152 ||  || — || February 3, 2003 || Haleakala || NEAT || — || align=right | 4.9 km || 
|-id=153 bgcolor=#d6d6d6
| 170153 ||  || — || February 4, 2003 || Anderson Mesa || LONEOS || — || align=right | 3.9 km || 
|-id=154 bgcolor=#d6d6d6
| 170154 ||  || — || February 23, 2003 || Campo Imperatore || CINEOS || — || align=right | 3.9 km || 
|-id=155 bgcolor=#fefefe
| 170155 ||  || — || February 28, 2003 || Socorro || LINEAR || H || align=right data-sort-value="0.99" | 990 m || 
|-id=156 bgcolor=#fefefe
| 170156 ||  || — || March 3, 2003 || Haleakala || NEAT || H || align=right | 1.2 km || 
|-id=157 bgcolor=#d6d6d6
| 170157 ||  || — || March 6, 2003 || Anderson Mesa || LONEOS || — || align=right | 4.9 km || 
|-id=158 bgcolor=#d6d6d6
| 170158 ||  || — || March 6, 2003 || Socorro || LINEAR || EOS || align=right | 3.2 km || 
|-id=159 bgcolor=#d6d6d6
| 170159 ||  || — || March 6, 2003 || Anderson Mesa || LONEOS || THM || align=right | 5.8 km || 
|-id=160 bgcolor=#fefefe
| 170160 ||  || — || March 8, 2003 || Socorro || LINEAR || H || align=right | 1.2 km || 
|-id=161 bgcolor=#fefefe
| 170161 ||  || — || March 14, 2003 || Socorro || LINEAR || H || align=right | 1.3 km || 
|-id=162 bgcolor=#d6d6d6
| 170162 Nicolashayek ||  ||  || March 23, 2003 || Vicques || M. Ory || — || align=right | 4.6 km || 
|-id=163 bgcolor=#d6d6d6
| 170163 ||  || — || March 23, 2003 || Palomar || NEAT || SYL7:4 || align=right | 5.9 km || 
|-id=164 bgcolor=#d6d6d6
| 170164 ||  || — || March 25, 2003 || Haleakala || NEAT || — || align=right | 5.8 km || 
|-id=165 bgcolor=#fefefe
| 170165 ||  || — || March 23, 2003 || Kitt Peak || Spacewatch || — || align=right | 1.2 km || 
|-id=166 bgcolor=#fefefe
| 170166 ||  || — || March 25, 2003 || Haleakala || NEAT || — || align=right | 1.2 km || 
|-id=167 bgcolor=#d6d6d6
| 170167 ||  || — || March 27, 2003 || Kitt Peak || Spacewatch || — || align=right | 4.0 km || 
|-id=168 bgcolor=#d6d6d6
| 170168 ||  || — || March 28, 2003 || Kitt Peak || Spacewatch || HYG || align=right | 4.5 km || 
|-id=169 bgcolor=#d6d6d6
| 170169 ||  || — || March 26, 2003 || Palomar || NEAT || EOS || align=right | 6.6 km || 
|-id=170 bgcolor=#fefefe
| 170170 ||  || — || March 31, 2003 || Socorro || LINEAR || — || align=right | 1.1 km || 
|-id=171 bgcolor=#d6d6d6
| 170171 ||  || — || April 5, 2003 || Socorro || LINEAR || — || align=right | 4.8 km || 
|-id=172 bgcolor=#FA8072
| 170172 ||  || — || April 24, 2003 || Anderson Mesa || LONEOS || — || align=right | 1.4 km || 
|-id=173 bgcolor=#fefefe
| 170173 ||  || — || April 29, 2003 || Socorro || LINEAR || — || align=right | 1.4 km || 
|-id=174 bgcolor=#fefefe
| 170174 ||  || — || May 22, 2003 || Kitt Peak || Spacewatch || FLO || align=right data-sort-value="0.78" | 780 m || 
|-id=175 bgcolor=#fefefe
| 170175 ||  || — || May 26, 2003 || Haleakala || NEAT || FLO || align=right | 1.2 km || 
|-id=176 bgcolor=#FA8072
| 170176 ||  || — || June 21, 2003 || Anderson Mesa || LONEOS || — || align=right | 1.2 km || 
|-id=177 bgcolor=#fefefe
| 170177 ||  || — || June 22, 2003 || Anderson Mesa || LONEOS || — || align=right | 1.5 km || 
|-id=178 bgcolor=#FA8072
| 170178 ||  || — || June 25, 2003 || Haleakala || NEAT || — || align=right | 1.3 km || 
|-id=179 bgcolor=#fefefe
| 170179 ||  || — || June 25, 2003 || Socorro || LINEAR || FLO || align=right | 1.6 km || 
|-id=180 bgcolor=#fefefe
| 170180 ||  || — || June 26, 2003 || Socorro || LINEAR || — || align=right | 1.8 km || 
|-id=181 bgcolor=#fefefe
| 170181 ||  || — || June 26, 2003 || Socorro || LINEAR || FLO || align=right | 1.4 km || 
|-id=182 bgcolor=#fefefe
| 170182 ||  || — || June 28, 2003 || Socorro || LINEAR || V || align=right | 1.0 km || 
|-id=183 bgcolor=#fefefe
| 170183 ||  || — || June 26, 2003 || Socorro || LINEAR || — || align=right data-sort-value="0.91" | 910 m || 
|-id=184 bgcolor=#fefefe
| 170184 ||  || — || June 27, 2003 || Anderson Mesa || LONEOS || ERI || align=right | 3.0 km || 
|-id=185 bgcolor=#fefefe
| 170185 ||  || — || July 3, 2003 || Kitt Peak || Spacewatch || V || align=right data-sort-value="0.97" | 970 m || 
|-id=186 bgcolor=#fefefe
| 170186 ||  || — || July 6, 2003 || Reedy Creek || J. Broughton || FLO || align=right | 1.7 km || 
|-id=187 bgcolor=#fefefe
| 170187 ||  || — || July 3, 2003 || Kitt Peak || Spacewatch || — || align=right | 1.0 km || 
|-id=188 bgcolor=#fefefe
| 170188 ||  || — || July 22, 2003 || Haleakala || NEAT || — || align=right | 1.1 km || 
|-id=189 bgcolor=#fefefe
| 170189 ||  || — || July 21, 2003 || Campo Imperatore || CINEOS || — || align=right | 1.4 km || 
|-id=190 bgcolor=#fefefe
| 170190 ||  || — || July 22, 2003 || Haleakala || NEAT || V || align=right | 1.2 km || 
|-id=191 bgcolor=#fefefe
| 170191 ||  || — || July 22, 2003 || Haleakala || NEAT || NYS || align=right | 1.3 km || 
|-id=192 bgcolor=#fefefe
| 170192 ||  || — || July 22, 2003 || Haleakala || NEAT || — || align=right | 1.3 km || 
|-id=193 bgcolor=#fefefe
| 170193 ||  || — || July 24, 2003 || Majorca || OAM Obs. || — || align=right | 1.5 km || 
|-id=194 bgcolor=#E9E9E9
| 170194 ||  || — || July 25, 2003 || Palomar || NEAT || — || align=right | 1.7 km || 
|-id=195 bgcolor=#fefefe
| 170195 ||  || — || July 25, 2003 || Palomar || NEAT || FLO || align=right | 1.5 km || 
|-id=196 bgcolor=#fefefe
| 170196 ||  || — || July 26, 2003 || Reedy Creek || J. Broughton || NYS || align=right | 2.3 km || 
|-id=197 bgcolor=#fefefe
| 170197 ||  || — || July 25, 2003 || Palomar || NEAT || — || align=right | 1.2 km || 
|-id=198 bgcolor=#fefefe
| 170198 ||  || — || July 25, 2003 || Socorro || LINEAR || — || align=right | 1.8 km || 
|-id=199 bgcolor=#fefefe
| 170199 ||  || — || July 26, 2003 || Palomar || NEAT || FLO || align=right data-sort-value="0.85" | 850 m || 
|-id=200 bgcolor=#E9E9E9
| 170200 ||  || — || July 30, 2003 || Campo Imperatore || CINEOS || — || align=right | 1.4 km || 
|}

170201–170300 

|-bgcolor=#fefefe
| 170201 ||  || — || July 30, 2003 || Campo Imperatore || CINEOS || — || align=right | 1.3 km || 
|-id=202 bgcolor=#fefefe
| 170202 ||  || — || July 30, 2003 || Socorro || LINEAR || — || align=right | 1.8 km || 
|-id=203 bgcolor=#fefefe
| 170203 ||  || — || July 24, 2003 || Palomar || NEAT || V || align=right data-sort-value="0.78" | 780 m || 
|-id=204 bgcolor=#fefefe
| 170204 ||  || — || July 24, 2003 || Palomar || NEAT || — || align=right data-sort-value="0.89" | 890 m || 
|-id=205 bgcolor=#fefefe
| 170205 ||  || — || July 30, 2003 || Socorro || LINEAR || V || align=right | 1.2 km || 
|-id=206 bgcolor=#fefefe
| 170206 ||  || — || August 1, 2003 || Socorro || LINEAR || — || align=right | 1.2 km || 
|-id=207 bgcolor=#fefefe
| 170207 ||  || — || August 1, 2003 || Socorro || LINEAR || ERI || align=right | 2.2 km || 
|-id=208 bgcolor=#fefefe
| 170208 ||  || — || August 2, 2003 || Haleakala || NEAT || V || align=right data-sort-value="0.87" | 870 m || 
|-id=209 bgcolor=#fefefe
| 170209 ||  || — || August 3, 2003 || Črni Vrh || Črni Vrh || — || align=right | 1.4 km || 
|-id=210 bgcolor=#fefefe
| 170210 ||  || — || August 4, 2003 || Socorro || LINEAR || — || align=right | 1.1 km || 
|-id=211 bgcolor=#fefefe
| 170211 ||  || — || August 4, 2003 || Socorro || LINEAR || — || align=right | 1.2 km || 
|-id=212 bgcolor=#fefefe
| 170212 || 2003 QS || — || August 18, 2003 || Campo Imperatore || CINEOS || — || align=right | 1.2 km || 
|-id=213 bgcolor=#fefefe
| 170213 ||  || — || August 18, 2003 || Haleakala || NEAT || MAS || align=right | 1.2 km || 
|-id=214 bgcolor=#fefefe
| 170214 ||  || — || August 20, 2003 || Palomar || NEAT || — || align=right | 3.1 km || 
|-id=215 bgcolor=#fefefe
| 170215 ||  || — || August 20, 2003 || Needville || Needville Obs. || — || align=right | 1.3 km || 
|-id=216 bgcolor=#fefefe
| 170216 ||  || — || August 19, 2003 || Campo Imperatore || CINEOS || — || align=right | 1.3 km || 
|-id=217 bgcolor=#fefefe
| 170217 ||  || — || August 21, 2003 || Palomar || NEAT || MAS || align=right | 1.0 km || 
|-id=218 bgcolor=#fefefe
| 170218 ||  || — || August 21, 2003 || Palomar || NEAT || NYS || align=right data-sort-value="0.79" | 790 m || 
|-id=219 bgcolor=#fefefe
| 170219 ||  || — || August 20, 2003 || Palomar || NEAT || V || align=right | 1.2 km || 
|-id=220 bgcolor=#fefefe
| 170220 ||  || — || August 21, 2003 || Haleakala || NEAT || — || align=right | 3.1 km || 
|-id=221 bgcolor=#fefefe
| 170221 ||  || — || August 22, 2003 || Haleakala || NEAT || NYS || align=right | 1.4 km || 
|-id=222 bgcolor=#fefefe
| 170222 ||  || — || August 22, 2003 || Palomar || NEAT || — || align=right | 1.7 km || 
|-id=223 bgcolor=#fefefe
| 170223 ||  || — || August 20, 2003 || Palomar || NEAT || — || align=right | 1.3 km || 
|-id=224 bgcolor=#fefefe
| 170224 ||  || — || August 20, 2003 || Palomar || NEAT || — || align=right | 1.1 km || 
|-id=225 bgcolor=#fefefe
| 170225 ||  || — || August 21, 2003 || Campo Imperatore || CINEOS || — || align=right | 1.2 km || 
|-id=226 bgcolor=#fefefe
| 170226 ||  || — || August 22, 2003 || Palomar || NEAT || NYS || align=right | 1.1 km || 
|-id=227 bgcolor=#fefefe
| 170227 ||  || — || August 22, 2003 || Socorro || LINEAR || MAS || align=right | 1.3 km || 
|-id=228 bgcolor=#fefefe
| 170228 ||  || — || August 22, 2003 || Palomar || NEAT || NYS || align=right | 1.0 km || 
|-id=229 bgcolor=#fefefe
| 170229 ||  || — || August 22, 2003 || Palomar || NEAT || V || align=right | 1.3 km || 
|-id=230 bgcolor=#fefefe
| 170230 ||  || — || August 22, 2003 || Palomar || NEAT || MAS || align=right | 1.1 km || 
|-id=231 bgcolor=#fefefe
| 170231 ||  || — || August 20, 2003 || Haleakala || NEAT || — || align=right | 1.1 km || 
|-id=232 bgcolor=#fefefe
| 170232 ||  || — || August 20, 2003 || Palomar || NEAT || V || align=right | 1.0 km || 
|-id=233 bgcolor=#fefefe
| 170233 ||  || — || August 20, 2003 || Palomar || NEAT || NYS || align=right | 2.3 km || 
|-id=234 bgcolor=#fefefe
| 170234 ||  || — || August 20, 2003 || Palomar || NEAT || V || align=right | 1.2 km || 
|-id=235 bgcolor=#fefefe
| 170235 ||  || — || August 21, 2003 || Palomar || NEAT || NYS || align=right | 1.0 km || 
|-id=236 bgcolor=#fefefe
| 170236 ||  || — || August 21, 2003 || Črni Vrh || Črni Vrh || FLO || align=right | 1.2 km || 
|-id=237 bgcolor=#fefefe
| 170237 ||  || — || August 22, 2003 || Haleakala || NEAT || — || align=right | 1.7 km || 
|-id=238 bgcolor=#fefefe
| 170238 ||  || — || August 21, 2003 || Črni Vrh || Črni Vrh || NYS || align=right | 1.0 km || 
|-id=239 bgcolor=#fefefe
| 170239 ||  || — || August 21, 2003 || Palomar || NEAT || MAS || align=right | 1.2 km || 
|-id=240 bgcolor=#fefefe
| 170240 ||  || — || August 22, 2003 || Socorro || LINEAR || MAS || align=right | 1.1 km || 
|-id=241 bgcolor=#fefefe
| 170241 ||  || — || August 22, 2003 || Palomar || NEAT || V || align=right data-sort-value="0.92" | 920 m || 
|-id=242 bgcolor=#fefefe
| 170242 ||  || — || August 22, 2003 || Palomar || NEAT || MAS || align=right | 1.1 km || 
|-id=243 bgcolor=#fefefe
| 170243 ||  || — || August 22, 2003 || Socorro || LINEAR || V || align=right | 1.2 km || 
|-id=244 bgcolor=#fefefe
| 170244 ||  || — || August 22, 2003 || Palomar || NEAT || MAS || align=right | 1.1 km || 
|-id=245 bgcolor=#fefefe
| 170245 ||  || — || August 22, 2003 || Socorro || LINEAR || NYS || align=right | 1.8 km || 
|-id=246 bgcolor=#fefefe
| 170246 ||  || — || August 22, 2003 || Socorro || LINEAR || NYS || align=right | 1.3 km || 
|-id=247 bgcolor=#fefefe
| 170247 ||  || — || August 22, 2003 || Palomar || NEAT || NYS || align=right | 1.0 km || 
|-id=248 bgcolor=#fefefe
| 170248 ||  || — || August 22, 2003 || Palomar || NEAT || NYS || align=right | 1.2 km || 
|-id=249 bgcolor=#fefefe
| 170249 ||  || — || August 23, 2003 || Socorro || LINEAR || NYS || align=right data-sort-value="0.89" | 890 m || 
|-id=250 bgcolor=#E9E9E9
| 170250 ||  || — || August 23, 2003 || Socorro || LINEAR || — || align=right | 2.4 km || 
|-id=251 bgcolor=#fefefe
| 170251 ||  || — || August 21, 2003 || Palomar || NEAT || NYS || align=right | 1.1 km || 
|-id=252 bgcolor=#fefefe
| 170252 ||  || — || August 22, 2003 || Haleakala || NEAT || MAS || align=right | 1.00 km || 
|-id=253 bgcolor=#E9E9E9
| 170253 ||  || — || August 22, 2003 || Palomar || NEAT || — || align=right | 1.3 km || 
|-id=254 bgcolor=#fefefe
| 170254 ||  || — || August 23, 2003 || Socorro || LINEAR || MAS || align=right | 1.2 km || 
|-id=255 bgcolor=#fefefe
| 170255 ||  || — || August 23, 2003 || Socorro || LINEAR || NYS || align=right | 1.1 km || 
|-id=256 bgcolor=#fefefe
| 170256 ||  || — || August 23, 2003 || Socorro || LINEAR || NYS || align=right | 1.0 km || 
|-id=257 bgcolor=#fefefe
| 170257 ||  || — || August 23, 2003 || Socorro || LINEAR || — || align=right | 1.8 km || 
|-id=258 bgcolor=#fefefe
| 170258 ||  || — || August 23, 2003 || Socorro || LINEAR || — || align=right | 1.4 km || 
|-id=259 bgcolor=#fefefe
| 170259 ||  || — || August 23, 2003 || Socorro || LINEAR || ERI || align=right | 3.3 km || 
|-id=260 bgcolor=#fefefe
| 170260 ||  || — || August 23, 2003 || Socorro || LINEAR || — || align=right | 2.1 km || 
|-id=261 bgcolor=#fefefe
| 170261 ||  || — || August 23, 2003 || Socorro || LINEAR || — || align=right | 1.4 km || 
|-id=262 bgcolor=#fefefe
| 170262 ||  || — || August 23, 2003 || Palomar || NEAT || — || align=right | 1.8 km || 
|-id=263 bgcolor=#fefefe
| 170263 ||  || — || August 23, 2003 || Socorro || LINEAR || NYS || align=right | 2.3 km || 
|-id=264 bgcolor=#fefefe
| 170264 ||  || — || August 25, 2003 || Palomar || NEAT || — || align=right | 5.5 km || 
|-id=265 bgcolor=#fefefe
| 170265 ||  || — || August 22, 2003 || Socorro || LINEAR || NYS || align=right | 1.0 km || 
|-id=266 bgcolor=#fefefe
| 170266 ||  || — || August 23, 2003 || Palomar || NEAT || V || align=right | 1.0 km || 
|-id=267 bgcolor=#fefefe
| 170267 ||  || — || August 24, 2003 || Socorro || LINEAR || ERI || align=right | 2.8 km || 
|-id=268 bgcolor=#fefefe
| 170268 ||  || — || August 24, 2003 || Socorro || LINEAR || — || align=right | 1.4 km || 
|-id=269 bgcolor=#fefefe
| 170269 ||  || — || August 24, 2003 || Socorro || LINEAR || V || align=right | 1.1 km || 
|-id=270 bgcolor=#fefefe
| 170270 ||  || — || August 24, 2003 || Socorro || LINEAR || — || align=right | 1.2 km || 
|-id=271 bgcolor=#fefefe
| 170271 ||  || — || August 24, 2003 || Socorro || LINEAR || — || align=right | 1.4 km || 
|-id=272 bgcolor=#fefefe
| 170272 ||  || — || August 24, 2003 || Cerro Tololo || M. W. Buie || NYS || align=right data-sort-value="0.92" | 920 m || 
|-id=273 bgcolor=#fefefe
| 170273 ||  || — || August 24, 2003 || Cerro Tololo || M. W. Buie || MAS || align=right | 1.0 km || 
|-id=274 bgcolor=#fefefe
| 170274 ||  || — || August 24, 2003 || Socorro || LINEAR || V || align=right data-sort-value="0.99" | 990 m || 
|-id=275 bgcolor=#fefefe
| 170275 ||  || — || August 26, 2003 || Socorro || LINEAR || MAS || align=right data-sort-value="0.98" | 980 m || 
|-id=276 bgcolor=#fefefe
| 170276 ||  || — || August 30, 2003 || Consell || R. Pacheco || — || align=right | 1.2 km || 
|-id=277 bgcolor=#fefefe
| 170277 ||  || — || August 27, 2003 || Palomar || NEAT || ERI || align=right | 3.4 km || 
|-id=278 bgcolor=#fefefe
| 170278 ||  || — || August 30, 2003 || Haleakala || NEAT || — || align=right | 1.4 km || 
|-id=279 bgcolor=#fefefe
| 170279 ||  || — || August 30, 2003 || Haleakala || NEAT || FLO || align=right | 1.5 km || 
|-id=280 bgcolor=#fefefe
| 170280 ||  || — || August 29, 2003 || Haleakala || NEAT || — || align=right | 2.0 km || 
|-id=281 bgcolor=#fefefe
| 170281 ||  || — || August 30, 2003 || Kitt Peak || Spacewatch || NYS || align=right | 1.0 km || 
|-id=282 bgcolor=#E9E9E9
| 170282 ||  || — || August 30, 2003 || Kitt Peak || Spacewatch || — || align=right | 4.3 km || 
|-id=283 bgcolor=#fefefe
| 170283 ||  || — || August 31, 2003 || Haleakala || NEAT || — || align=right | 1.4 km || 
|-id=284 bgcolor=#fefefe
| 170284 ||  || — || August 22, 2003 || Palomar || NEAT || NYS || align=right data-sort-value="0.91" | 910 m || 
|-id=285 bgcolor=#fefefe
| 170285 ||  || — || August 23, 2003 || Socorro || LINEAR || NYS || align=right | 1.0 km || 
|-id=286 bgcolor=#fefefe
| 170286 ||  || — || September 3, 2003 || Črni Vrh || Črni Vrh || V || align=right | 1.2 km || 
|-id=287 bgcolor=#fefefe
| 170287 ||  || — || September 13, 2003 || Anderson Mesa || LONEOS || — || align=right | 1.2 km || 
|-id=288 bgcolor=#fefefe
| 170288 ||  || — || September 14, 2003 || Haleakala || NEAT || MAS || align=right | 1.1 km || 
|-id=289 bgcolor=#fefefe
| 170289 ||  || — || September 14, 2003 || Haleakala || NEAT || NYS || align=right | 1.5 km || 
|-id=290 bgcolor=#fefefe
| 170290 ||  || — || September 15, 2003 || Palomar || NEAT || MAS || align=right data-sort-value="0.82" | 820 m || 
|-id=291 bgcolor=#fefefe
| 170291 ||  || — || September 14, 2003 || Haleakala || NEAT || — || align=right | 1.3 km || 
|-id=292 bgcolor=#fefefe
| 170292 ||  || — || September 15, 2003 || Anderson Mesa || LONEOS || — || align=right | 2.1 km || 
|-id=293 bgcolor=#fefefe
| 170293 ||  || — || September 15, 2003 || Anderson Mesa || LONEOS || NYS || align=right | 1.0 km || 
|-id=294 bgcolor=#fefefe
| 170294 ||  || — || September 15, 2003 || Anderson Mesa || LONEOS || NYS || align=right | 1.2 km || 
|-id=295 bgcolor=#fefefe
| 170295 || 2003 SW || — || September 16, 2003 || Kitt Peak || Spacewatch || NYS || align=right data-sort-value="0.88" | 880 m || 
|-id=296 bgcolor=#fefefe
| 170296 ||  || — || September 16, 2003 || Palomar || NEAT || — || align=right | 1.3 km || 
|-id=297 bgcolor=#fefefe
| 170297 ||  || — || September 16, 2003 || Kitt Peak || Spacewatch || — || align=right | 1.4 km || 
|-id=298 bgcolor=#fefefe
| 170298 ||  || — || September 16, 2003 || Kitt Peak || Spacewatch || NYS || align=right | 1.1 km || 
|-id=299 bgcolor=#fefefe
| 170299 ||  || — || September 16, 2003 || Palomar || NEAT || — || align=right | 1.3 km || 
|-id=300 bgcolor=#fefefe
| 170300 ||  || — || September 17, 2003 || Kitt Peak || Spacewatch || MAS || align=right | 1.1 km || 
|}

170301–170400 

|-bgcolor=#fefefe
| 170301 ||  || — || September 17, 2003 || Kitt Peak || Spacewatch || NYS || align=right data-sort-value="0.87" | 870 m || 
|-id=302 bgcolor=#fefefe
| 170302 ||  || — || September 17, 2003 || Kitt Peak || Spacewatch || NYS || align=right | 1.1 km || 
|-id=303 bgcolor=#fefefe
| 170303 ||  || — || September 17, 2003 || Kitt Peak || Spacewatch || NYS || align=right data-sort-value="0.85" | 850 m || 
|-id=304 bgcolor=#E9E9E9
| 170304 ||  || — || September 16, 2003 || Kitt Peak || Spacewatch || MIS || align=right | 4.1 km || 
|-id=305 bgcolor=#E9E9E9
| 170305 ||  || — || September 17, 2003 || Haleakala || NEAT || — || align=right | 2.0 km || 
|-id=306 bgcolor=#fefefe
| 170306 Augustzátka ||  ||  || September 18, 2003 || Kleť || KLENOT || V || align=right | 1.2 km || 
|-id=307 bgcolor=#fefefe
| 170307 ||  || — || September 16, 2003 || Anderson Mesa || LONEOS || NYS || align=right data-sort-value="0.91" | 910 m || 
|-id=308 bgcolor=#fefefe
| 170308 ||  || — || September 18, 2003 || Socorro || LINEAR || — || align=right | 1.4 km || 
|-id=309 bgcolor=#fefefe
| 170309 ||  || — || September 18, 2003 || Desert Eagle || W. K. Y. Yeung || V || align=right | 1.4 km || 
|-id=310 bgcolor=#E9E9E9
| 170310 ||  || — || September 16, 2003 || Palomar || NEAT || — || align=right | 4.8 km || 
|-id=311 bgcolor=#fefefe
| 170311 ||  || — || September 16, 2003 || Palomar || NEAT || — || align=right | 1.5 km || 
|-id=312 bgcolor=#fefefe
| 170312 ||  || — || September 16, 2003 || Anderson Mesa || LONEOS || V || align=right | 1.0 km || 
|-id=313 bgcolor=#fefefe
| 170313 ||  || — || September 16, 2003 || Anderson Mesa || LONEOS || — || align=right | 1.3 km || 
|-id=314 bgcolor=#fefefe
| 170314 ||  || — || September 16, 2003 || Anderson Mesa || LONEOS || — || align=right | 1.3 km || 
|-id=315 bgcolor=#fefefe
| 170315 ||  || — || September 16, 2003 || Anderson Mesa || LONEOS || — || align=right | 1.3 km || 
|-id=316 bgcolor=#fefefe
| 170316 ||  || — || September 18, 2003 || Palomar || NEAT || — || align=right | 1.3 km || 
|-id=317 bgcolor=#fefefe
| 170317 ||  || — || September 16, 2003 || Kitt Peak || Spacewatch || — || align=right | 1.3 km || 
|-id=318 bgcolor=#fefefe
| 170318 ||  || — || September 16, 2003 || Kitt Peak || Spacewatch || NYS || align=right data-sort-value="0.87" | 870 m || 
|-id=319 bgcolor=#fefefe
| 170319 ||  || — || September 16, 2003 || Anderson Mesa || LONEOS || V || align=right | 1.2 km || 
|-id=320 bgcolor=#E9E9E9
| 170320 ||  || — || September 19, 2003 || Socorro || LINEAR || — || align=right | 1.7 km || 
|-id=321 bgcolor=#E9E9E9
| 170321 ||  || — || September 18, 2003 || Kitt Peak || Spacewatch || HEN || align=right | 1.9 km || 
|-id=322 bgcolor=#E9E9E9
| 170322 ||  || — || September 18, 2003 || Kitt Peak || Spacewatch || — || align=right | 1.7 km || 
|-id=323 bgcolor=#fefefe
| 170323 ||  || — || September 18, 2003 || Kitt Peak || Spacewatch || MAS || align=right | 1.1 km || 
|-id=324 bgcolor=#fefefe
| 170324 ||  || — || September 18, 2003 || Kitt Peak || Spacewatch || MAS || align=right | 1.0 km || 
|-id=325 bgcolor=#fefefe
| 170325 ||  || — || September 19, 2003 || Kitt Peak || Spacewatch || V || align=right | 1.0 km || 
|-id=326 bgcolor=#fefefe
| 170326 ||  || — || September 18, 2003 || Kitt Peak || Spacewatch || MAS || align=right data-sort-value="0.86" | 860 m || 
|-id=327 bgcolor=#fefefe
| 170327 ||  || — || September 18, 2003 || Kitt Peak || Spacewatch || NYS || align=right data-sort-value="0.95" | 950 m || 
|-id=328 bgcolor=#fefefe
| 170328 ||  || — || September 17, 2003 || Socorro || LINEAR || — || align=right | 1.5 km || 
|-id=329 bgcolor=#fefefe
| 170329 ||  || — || September 18, 2003 || Palomar || NEAT || V || align=right | 1.2 km || 
|-id=330 bgcolor=#fefefe
| 170330 ||  || — || September 19, 2003 || Kitt Peak || Spacewatch || FLO || align=right data-sort-value="0.85" | 850 m || 
|-id=331 bgcolor=#fefefe
| 170331 ||  || — || September 20, 2003 || Palomar || NEAT || — || align=right | 1.4 km || 
|-id=332 bgcolor=#fefefe
| 170332 ||  || — || September 20, 2003 || Socorro || LINEAR || NYS || align=right | 1.1 km || 
|-id=333 bgcolor=#fefefe
| 170333 ||  || — || September 20, 2003 || Palomar || NEAT || — || align=right | 1.7 km || 
|-id=334 bgcolor=#E9E9E9
| 170334 ||  || — || September 20, 2003 || Palomar || NEAT || — || align=right | 1.7 km || 
|-id=335 bgcolor=#fefefe
| 170335 ||  || — || September 20, 2003 || Palomar || NEAT || V || align=right | 1.4 km || 
|-id=336 bgcolor=#fefefe
| 170336 ||  || — || September 16, 2003 || Anderson Mesa || LONEOS || — || align=right | 1.5 km || 
|-id=337 bgcolor=#fefefe
| 170337 ||  || — || September 17, 2003 || Kitt Peak || Spacewatch || — || align=right | 1.6 km || 
|-id=338 bgcolor=#fefefe
| 170338 ||  || — || September 18, 2003 || Campo Imperatore || CINEOS || — || align=right | 1.3 km || 
|-id=339 bgcolor=#fefefe
| 170339 ||  || — || September 19, 2003 || Palomar || NEAT || NYS || align=right | 1.1 km || 
|-id=340 bgcolor=#fefefe
| 170340 ||  || — || September 19, 2003 || Socorro || LINEAR || — || align=right | 1.8 km || 
|-id=341 bgcolor=#fefefe
| 170341 ||  || — || September 20, 2003 || Palomar || NEAT || V || align=right | 1.3 km || 
|-id=342 bgcolor=#fefefe
| 170342 ||  || — || September 19, 2003 || Anderson Mesa || LONEOS || NYS || align=right | 1.1 km || 
|-id=343 bgcolor=#fefefe
| 170343 ||  || — || September 19, 2003 || Anderson Mesa || LONEOS || — || align=right | 1.5 km || 
|-id=344 bgcolor=#fefefe
| 170344 ||  || — || September 19, 2003 || Anderson Mesa || LONEOS || NYS || align=right | 1.2 km || 
|-id=345 bgcolor=#fefefe
| 170345 ||  || — || September 20, 2003 || Socorro || LINEAR || NYS || align=right | 1.2 km || 
|-id=346 bgcolor=#fefefe
| 170346 ||  || — || September 18, 2003 || Socorro || LINEAR || — || align=right | 1.0 km || 
|-id=347 bgcolor=#fefefe
| 170347 ||  || — || September 21, 2003 || Socorro || LINEAR || NYS || align=right | 1.1 km || 
|-id=348 bgcolor=#E9E9E9
| 170348 ||  || — || September 23, 2003 || Haleakala || NEAT || — || align=right | 3.4 km || 
|-id=349 bgcolor=#fefefe
| 170349 ||  || — || September 18, 2003 || Kitt Peak || Spacewatch || — || align=right | 1.1 km || 
|-id=350 bgcolor=#fefefe
| 170350 ||  || — || September 18, 2003 || Kitt Peak || Spacewatch || — || align=right | 1.4 km || 
|-id=351 bgcolor=#fefefe
| 170351 ||  || — || September 18, 2003 || Palomar || NEAT || NYS || align=right data-sort-value="0.87" | 870 m || 
|-id=352 bgcolor=#fefefe
| 170352 ||  || — || September 18, 2003 || Palomar || NEAT || — || align=right | 1.3 km || 
|-id=353 bgcolor=#fefefe
| 170353 ||  || — || September 18, 2003 || Palomar || NEAT || — || align=right | 1.1 km || 
|-id=354 bgcolor=#E9E9E9
| 170354 ||  || — || September 19, 2003 || Anderson Mesa || LONEOS || AGN || align=right | 2.3 km || 
|-id=355 bgcolor=#fefefe
| 170355 ||  || — || September 21, 2003 || Kitt Peak || Spacewatch || — || align=right | 1.5 km || 
|-id=356 bgcolor=#fefefe
| 170356 ||  || — || September 22, 2003 || Anderson Mesa || LONEOS || — || align=right | 1.3 km || 
|-id=357 bgcolor=#fefefe
| 170357 ||  || — || September 18, 2003 || Campo Imperatore || CINEOS || — || align=right | 1.2 km || 
|-id=358 bgcolor=#fefefe
| 170358 ||  || — || September 18, 2003 || Palomar || NEAT || — || align=right | 1.4 km || 
|-id=359 bgcolor=#fefefe
| 170359 ||  || — || September 20, 2003 || Kitt Peak || Spacewatch || — || align=right | 1.2 km || 
|-id=360 bgcolor=#fefefe
| 170360 ||  || — || September 22, 2003 || Anderson Mesa || LONEOS || — || align=right | 1.4 km || 
|-id=361 bgcolor=#fefefe
| 170361 ||  || — || September 24, 2003 || Palomar || NEAT || — || align=right | 1.6 km || 
|-id=362 bgcolor=#E9E9E9
| 170362 ||  || — || September 24, 2003 || Haleakala || NEAT || RAF || align=right | 1.2 km || 
|-id=363 bgcolor=#fefefe
| 170363 ||  || — || September 23, 2003 || Palomar || NEAT || V || align=right | 1.1 km || 
|-id=364 bgcolor=#fefefe
| 170364 ||  || — || September 23, 2003 || Palomar || NEAT || V || align=right | 1.0 km || 
|-id=365 bgcolor=#fefefe
| 170365 ||  || — || September 25, 2003 || Haleakala || NEAT || — || align=right | 1.3 km || 
|-id=366 bgcolor=#fefefe
| 170366 ||  || — || September 26, 2003 || Socorro || LINEAR || EUT || align=right | 1.2 km || 
|-id=367 bgcolor=#fefefe
| 170367 ||  || — || September 26, 2003 || Socorro || LINEAR || — || align=right | 1.2 km || 
|-id=368 bgcolor=#fefefe
| 170368 ||  || — || September 24, 2003 || Palomar || NEAT || V || align=right | 1.0 km || 
|-id=369 bgcolor=#fefefe
| 170369 ||  || — || September 25, 2003 || Palomar || NEAT || NYS || align=right | 1.2 km || 
|-id=370 bgcolor=#E9E9E9
| 170370 ||  || — || September 26, 2003 || Socorro || LINEAR || — || align=right | 1.2 km || 
|-id=371 bgcolor=#fefefe
| 170371 ||  || — || September 27, 2003 || Socorro || LINEAR || — || align=right | 1.3 km || 
|-id=372 bgcolor=#fefefe
| 170372 ||  || — || September 28, 2003 || Socorro || LINEAR || — || align=right | 1.5 km || 
|-id=373 bgcolor=#fefefe
| 170373 ||  || — || September 26, 2003 || Socorro || LINEAR || MAS || align=right | 1.0 km || 
|-id=374 bgcolor=#E9E9E9
| 170374 ||  || — || September 26, 2003 || Socorro || LINEAR || — || align=right | 1.5 km || 
|-id=375 bgcolor=#E9E9E9
| 170375 ||  || — || September 27, 2003 || Desert Eagle || W. K. Y. Yeung || — || align=right | 1.9 km || 
|-id=376 bgcolor=#fefefe
| 170376 ||  || — || September 27, 2003 || Kitt Peak || Spacewatch || NYS || align=right data-sort-value="0.90" | 900 m || 
|-id=377 bgcolor=#fefefe
| 170377 ||  || — || September 25, 2003 || Haleakala || NEAT || — || align=right | 1.3 km || 
|-id=378 bgcolor=#E9E9E9
| 170378 ||  || — || September 27, 2003 || Socorro || LINEAR || HNS || align=right | 1.9 km || 
|-id=379 bgcolor=#fefefe
| 170379 ||  || — || September 27, 2003 || Socorro || LINEAR || — || align=right | 1.5 km || 
|-id=380 bgcolor=#fefefe
| 170380 ||  || — || September 28, 2003 || Anderson Mesa || LONEOS || — || align=right | 1.3 km || 
|-id=381 bgcolor=#fefefe
| 170381 ||  || — || September 20, 2003 || Socorro || LINEAR || — || align=right | 1.8 km || 
|-id=382 bgcolor=#fefefe
| 170382 ||  || — || September 20, 2003 || Socorro || LINEAR || V || align=right | 1.0 km || 
|-id=383 bgcolor=#fefefe
| 170383 ||  || — || September 28, 2003 || Socorro || LINEAR || NYS || align=right | 1.2 km || 
|-id=384 bgcolor=#fefefe
| 170384 ||  || — || September 28, 2003 || Desert Eagle || W. K. Y. Yeung || V || align=right | 1.1 km || 
|-id=385 bgcolor=#fefefe
| 170385 ||  || — || September 28, 2003 || Socorro || LINEAR || ERI || align=right | 2.8 km || 
|-id=386 bgcolor=#fefefe
| 170386 ||  || — || September 27, 2003 || Socorro || LINEAR || SUL || align=right | 3.0 km || 
|-id=387 bgcolor=#E9E9E9
| 170387 ||  || — || September 28, 2003 || Socorro || LINEAR || — || align=right | 1.6 km || 
|-id=388 bgcolor=#fefefe
| 170388 ||  || — || September 29, 2003 || Anderson Mesa || LONEOS || LCI || align=right | 1.1 km || 
|-id=389 bgcolor=#fefefe
| 170389 ||  || — || September 18, 2003 || Haleakala || NEAT || CHL || align=right | 2.6 km || 
|-id=390 bgcolor=#fefefe
| 170390 ||  || — || September 18, 2003 || Haleakala || NEAT || MAS || align=right | 1.1 km || 
|-id=391 bgcolor=#fefefe
| 170391 ||  || — || September 17, 2003 || Palomar || NEAT || FLO || align=right | 1.1 km || 
|-id=392 bgcolor=#E9E9E9
| 170392 ||  || — || September 17, 2003 || Palomar || NEAT || HOF || align=right | 4.9 km || 
|-id=393 bgcolor=#fefefe
| 170393 ||  || — || September 17, 2003 || Palomar || NEAT || — || align=right | 1.8 km || 
|-id=394 bgcolor=#E9E9E9
| 170394 ||  || — || September 20, 2003 || Anderson Mesa || LONEOS || — || align=right | 1.1 km || 
|-id=395 bgcolor=#E9E9E9
| 170395 Nicolevogt ||  ||  || September 26, 2003 || Apache Point || SDSS || — || align=right | 1.3 km || 
|-id=396 bgcolor=#E9E9E9
| 170396 ||  || — || September 18, 2003 || Palomar || NEAT || — || align=right | 2.0 km || 
|-id=397 bgcolor=#E9E9E9
| 170397 ||  || — || October 6, 2003 || Socorro || LINEAR || — || align=right | 3.4 km || 
|-id=398 bgcolor=#fefefe
| 170398 ||  || — || October 3, 2003 || Kitt Peak || Spacewatch || — || align=right | 1.4 km || 
|-id=399 bgcolor=#fefefe
| 170399 ||  || — || October 15, 2003 || Anderson Mesa || LONEOS || NYS || align=right | 1.4 km || 
|-id=400 bgcolor=#fefefe
| 170400 ||  || — || October 14, 2003 || Palomar || NEAT || V || align=right data-sort-value="0.92" | 920 m || 
|}

170401–170500 

|-bgcolor=#fefefe
| 170401 ||  || — || October 15, 2003 || Uccle || T. Pauwels || — || align=right | 1.4 km || 
|-id=402 bgcolor=#fefefe
| 170402 ||  || — || October 15, 2003 || Palomar || NEAT || — || align=right | 1.4 km || 
|-id=403 bgcolor=#fefefe
| 170403 ||  || — || October 3, 2003 || Haleakala || NEAT || — || align=right | 1.9 km || 
|-id=404 bgcolor=#E9E9E9
| 170404 ||  || — || October 16, 2003 || Kitt Peak || Spacewatch || ADE || align=right | 3.5 km || 
|-id=405 bgcolor=#FA8072
| 170405 ||  || — || October 16, 2003 || Črni Vrh || Črni Vrh || — || align=right | 1.9 km || 
|-id=406 bgcolor=#E9E9E9
| 170406 ||  || — || October 16, 2003 || Kitt Peak || Spacewatch || EUN || align=right | 1.2 km || 
|-id=407 bgcolor=#E9E9E9
| 170407 ||  || — || October 16, 2003 || Palomar || NEAT || — || align=right | 2.8 km || 
|-id=408 bgcolor=#fefefe
| 170408 ||  || — || October 16, 2003 || Kitt Peak || Spacewatch || — || align=right | 3.2 km || 
|-id=409 bgcolor=#fefefe
| 170409 ||  || — || October 23, 2003 || Goodricke-Pigott || R. A. Tucker || — || align=right | 1.5 km || 
|-id=410 bgcolor=#fefefe
| 170410 ||  || — || October 24, 2003 || Goodricke-Pigott || R. A. Tucker || — || align=right | 3.1 km || 
|-id=411 bgcolor=#fefefe
| 170411 ||  || — || October 22, 2003 || Goodricke-Pigott || R. A. Tucker || V || align=right | 1.2 km || 
|-id=412 bgcolor=#fefefe
| 170412 ||  || — || October 22, 2003 || Kitt Peak || Spacewatch || MAS || align=right data-sort-value="0.91" | 910 m || 
|-id=413 bgcolor=#E9E9E9
| 170413 ||  || — || October 16, 2003 || Kitt Peak || Spacewatch || PAD || align=right | 4.5 km || 
|-id=414 bgcolor=#E9E9E9
| 170414 ||  || — || October 16, 2003 || Kitt Peak || Spacewatch || RAF || align=right | 1.8 km || 
|-id=415 bgcolor=#E9E9E9
| 170415 ||  || — || October 27, 2003 || Socorro || LINEAR || INO || align=right | 1.8 km || 
|-id=416 bgcolor=#E9E9E9
| 170416 ||  || — || October 18, 2003 || Palomar || NEAT || MAR || align=right | 2.3 km || 
|-id=417 bgcolor=#E9E9E9
| 170417 ||  || — || October 18, 2003 || Palomar || NEAT || — || align=right | 5.2 km || 
|-id=418 bgcolor=#E9E9E9
| 170418 ||  || — || October 19, 2003 || Goodricke-Pigott || R. A. Tucker || — || align=right | 3.7 km || 
|-id=419 bgcolor=#E9E9E9
| 170419 ||  || — || October 16, 2003 || Palomar || NEAT || — || align=right | 2.0 km || 
|-id=420 bgcolor=#E9E9E9
| 170420 ||  || — || October 19, 2003 || Kitt Peak || Spacewatch || — || align=right | 2.8 km || 
|-id=421 bgcolor=#E9E9E9
| 170421 ||  || — || October 19, 2003 || Kitt Peak || Spacewatch || — || align=right | 2.0 km || 
|-id=422 bgcolor=#fefefe
| 170422 ||  || — || October 17, 2003 || Anderson Mesa || LONEOS || — || align=right | 1.6 km || 
|-id=423 bgcolor=#E9E9E9
| 170423 ||  || — || October 18, 2003 || Palomar || NEAT || EUN || align=right | 2.0 km || 
|-id=424 bgcolor=#E9E9E9
| 170424 ||  || — || October 18, 2003 || Palomar || NEAT || JUN || align=right | 1.2 km || 
|-id=425 bgcolor=#fefefe
| 170425 ||  || — || October 20, 2003 || Socorro || LINEAR || — || align=right | 1.4 km || 
|-id=426 bgcolor=#E9E9E9
| 170426 ||  || — || October 20, 2003 || Socorro || LINEAR || — || align=right | 1.1 km || 
|-id=427 bgcolor=#fefefe
| 170427 ||  || — || October 20, 2003 || Palomar || NEAT || — || align=right | 1.4 km || 
|-id=428 bgcolor=#fefefe
| 170428 ||  || — || October 18, 2003 || Kitt Peak || Spacewatch || — || align=right | 1.1 km || 
|-id=429 bgcolor=#fefefe
| 170429 ||  || — || October 18, 2003 || Kitt Peak || Spacewatch || NYS || align=right | 1.0 km || 
|-id=430 bgcolor=#fefefe
| 170430 ||  || — || October 19, 2003 || Anderson Mesa || LONEOS || — || align=right | 1.7 km || 
|-id=431 bgcolor=#fefefe
| 170431 ||  || — || October 20, 2003 || Socorro || LINEAR || NYS || align=right | 2.8 km || 
|-id=432 bgcolor=#fefefe
| 170432 ||  || — || October 20, 2003 || Socorro || LINEAR || — || align=right | 1.8 km || 
|-id=433 bgcolor=#E9E9E9
| 170433 ||  || — || October 20, 2003 || Socorro || LINEAR || — || align=right | 3.9 km || 
|-id=434 bgcolor=#fefefe
| 170434 ||  || — || October 28, 2003 || Socorro || LINEAR || NYS || align=right | 1.2 km || 
|-id=435 bgcolor=#fefefe
| 170435 ||  || — || October 17, 2003 || Kitt Peak || Spacewatch || V || align=right | 1.0 km || 
|-id=436 bgcolor=#E9E9E9
| 170436 ||  || — || October 19, 2003 || Socorro || LINEAR || — || align=right | 1.6 km || 
|-id=437 bgcolor=#E9E9E9
| 170437 ||  || — || October 20, 2003 || Palomar || NEAT || — || align=right | 2.0 km || 
|-id=438 bgcolor=#E9E9E9
| 170438 ||  || — || October 19, 2003 || Palomar || NEAT || — || align=right | 3.9 km || 
|-id=439 bgcolor=#E9E9E9
| 170439 ||  || — || October 19, 2003 || Palomar || NEAT || — || align=right | 2.1 km || 
|-id=440 bgcolor=#fefefe
| 170440 ||  || — || October 21, 2003 || Palomar || NEAT || PHO || align=right | 2.0 km || 
|-id=441 bgcolor=#fefefe
| 170441 ||  || — || October 18, 2003 || Anderson Mesa || LONEOS || — || align=right | 1.4 km || 
|-id=442 bgcolor=#E9E9E9
| 170442 ||  || — || October 18, 2003 || Anderson Mesa || LONEOS || — || align=right | 1.3 km || 
|-id=443 bgcolor=#fefefe
| 170443 ||  || — || October 18, 2003 || Anderson Mesa || LONEOS || NYS || align=right | 1.2 km || 
|-id=444 bgcolor=#E9E9E9
| 170444 ||  || — || October 20, 2003 || Kitt Peak || Spacewatch || EUN || align=right | 1.9 km || 
|-id=445 bgcolor=#E9E9E9
| 170445 ||  || — || October 21, 2003 || Socorro || LINEAR || — || align=right | 1.7 km || 
|-id=446 bgcolor=#E9E9E9
| 170446 ||  || — || October 21, 2003 || Palomar || NEAT || KON || align=right | 3.0 km || 
|-id=447 bgcolor=#E9E9E9
| 170447 ||  || — || October 21, 2003 || Palomar || NEAT || — || align=right | 2.8 km || 
|-id=448 bgcolor=#fefefe
| 170448 ||  || — || October 21, 2003 || Socorro || LINEAR || — || align=right | 1.6 km || 
|-id=449 bgcolor=#E9E9E9
| 170449 ||  || — || October 21, 2003 || Kitt Peak || Spacewatch || — || align=right | 1.2 km || 
|-id=450 bgcolor=#E9E9E9
| 170450 ||  || — || October 22, 2003 || Kitt Peak || Spacewatch || WIT || align=right | 1.5 km || 
|-id=451 bgcolor=#fefefe
| 170451 ||  || — || October 20, 2003 || Socorro || LINEAR || — || align=right | 1.3 km || 
|-id=452 bgcolor=#E9E9E9
| 170452 ||  || — || October 20, 2003 || Kitt Peak || Spacewatch || — || align=right | 1.5 km || 
|-id=453 bgcolor=#E9E9E9
| 170453 ||  || — || October 21, 2003 || Socorro || LINEAR || — || align=right | 1.2 km || 
|-id=454 bgcolor=#d6d6d6
| 170454 ||  || — || October 21, 2003 || Palomar || NEAT || — || align=right | 4.3 km || 
|-id=455 bgcolor=#E9E9E9
| 170455 ||  || — || October 21, 2003 || Palomar || NEAT || MIT || align=right | 2.8 km || 
|-id=456 bgcolor=#fefefe
| 170456 ||  || — || October 21, 2003 || Palomar || NEAT || NYS || align=right | 1.3 km || 
|-id=457 bgcolor=#fefefe
| 170457 ||  || — || October 22, 2003 || Kitt Peak || Spacewatch || — || align=right | 1.4 km || 
|-id=458 bgcolor=#fefefe
| 170458 ||  || — || October 20, 2003 || Kitt Peak || Spacewatch || V || align=right | 1.1 km || 
|-id=459 bgcolor=#fefefe
| 170459 ||  || — || October 21, 2003 || Kitt Peak || Spacewatch || — || align=right | 1.1 km || 
|-id=460 bgcolor=#E9E9E9
| 170460 ||  || — || October 22, 2003 || Socorro || LINEAR || HNS || align=right | 1.9 km || 
|-id=461 bgcolor=#fefefe
| 170461 ||  || — || October 22, 2003 || Socorro || LINEAR || V || align=right | 1.4 km || 
|-id=462 bgcolor=#fefefe
| 170462 ||  || — || October 22, 2003 || Kitt Peak || Spacewatch || NYS || align=right | 1.1 km || 
|-id=463 bgcolor=#E9E9E9
| 170463 ||  || — || October 22, 2003 || Kitt Peak || Spacewatch || — || align=right | 3.5 km || 
|-id=464 bgcolor=#d6d6d6
| 170464 ||  || — || October 23, 2003 || Kitt Peak || Spacewatch || — || align=right | 3.7 km || 
|-id=465 bgcolor=#E9E9E9
| 170465 ||  || — || October 23, 2003 || Kitt Peak || Spacewatch || KON || align=right | 3.7 km || 
|-id=466 bgcolor=#E9E9E9
| 170466 ||  || — || October 23, 2003 || Kitt Peak || Spacewatch || — || align=right | 1.8 km || 
|-id=467 bgcolor=#E9E9E9
| 170467 ||  || — || October 21, 2003 || Socorro || LINEAR || EUN || align=right | 2.3 km || 
|-id=468 bgcolor=#fefefe
| 170468 ||  || — || October 23, 2003 || Kitt Peak || Spacewatch || SUL || align=right | 3.0 km || 
|-id=469 bgcolor=#E9E9E9
| 170469 ||  || — || October 24, 2003 || Socorro || LINEAR || HNS || align=right | 2.1 km || 
|-id=470 bgcolor=#E9E9E9
| 170470 ||  || — || October 23, 2003 || Kitt Peak || Spacewatch || — || align=right | 1.4 km || 
|-id=471 bgcolor=#fefefe
| 170471 ||  || — || October 23, 2003 || Haleakala || NEAT || — || align=right | 1.5 km || 
|-id=472 bgcolor=#fefefe
| 170472 ||  || — || October 24, 2003 || Socorro || LINEAR || — || align=right | 1.2 km || 
|-id=473 bgcolor=#E9E9E9
| 170473 ||  || — || October 24, 2003 || Socorro || LINEAR || EUN || align=right | 1.7 km || 
|-id=474 bgcolor=#E9E9E9
| 170474 ||  || — || October 24, 2003 || Socorro || LINEAR || — || align=right | 2.7 km || 
|-id=475 bgcolor=#E9E9E9
| 170475 ||  || — || October 26, 2003 || Kitt Peak || Spacewatch || BAR || align=right | 2.6 km || 
|-id=476 bgcolor=#E9E9E9
| 170476 ||  || — || October 26, 2003 || Kitt Peak || Spacewatch || — || align=right | 2.4 km || 
|-id=477 bgcolor=#E9E9E9
| 170477 ||  || — || October 25, 2003 || Socorro || LINEAR || — || align=right | 2.5 km || 
|-id=478 bgcolor=#fefefe
| 170478 ||  || — || October 26, 2003 || Kitt Peak || Spacewatch || — || align=right | 1.5 km || 
|-id=479 bgcolor=#E9E9E9
| 170479 ||  || — || October 26, 2003 || Socorro || LINEAR || — || align=right | 3.5 km || 
|-id=480 bgcolor=#E9E9E9
| 170480 ||  || — || October 28, 2003 || Socorro || LINEAR || ADE || align=right | 2.8 km || 
|-id=481 bgcolor=#E9E9E9
| 170481 ||  || — || October 28, 2003 || Socorro || LINEAR || — || align=right | 1.8 km || 
|-id=482 bgcolor=#fefefe
| 170482 ||  || — || October 28, 2003 || Haleakala || NEAT || — || align=right | 1.9 km || 
|-id=483 bgcolor=#E9E9E9
| 170483 ||  || — || October 28, 2003 || Socorro || LINEAR || — || align=right | 1.8 km || 
|-id=484 bgcolor=#fefefe
| 170484 ||  || — || October 29, 2003 || Socorro || LINEAR || — || align=right | 1.6 km || 
|-id=485 bgcolor=#E9E9E9
| 170485 ||  || — || October 30, 2003 || Haleakala || NEAT || ADE || align=right | 3.0 km || 
|-id=486 bgcolor=#E9E9E9
| 170486 ||  || — || October 28, 2003 || Socorro || LINEAR || — || align=right | 1.8 km || 
|-id=487 bgcolor=#fefefe
| 170487 Mallder ||  ||  || October 22, 2003 || Kitt Peak || M. W. Buie || NYS || align=right | 1.0 km || 
|-id=488 bgcolor=#fefefe
| 170488 ||  || — || October 21, 2003 || Palomar || NEAT || CLA || align=right | 2.7 km || 
|-id=489 bgcolor=#fefefe
| 170489 ||  || — || October 16, 2003 || Kitt Peak || Spacewatch || NYS || align=right data-sort-value="0.77" | 770 m || 
|-id=490 bgcolor=#fefefe
| 170490 ||  || — || October 17, 2003 || Anderson Mesa || LONEOS || — || align=right | 1.6 km || 
|-id=491 bgcolor=#fefefe
| 170491 ||  || — || October 21, 2003 || Kitt Peak || Spacewatch || — || align=right | 1.9 km || 
|-id=492 bgcolor=#E9E9E9
| 170492 ||  || — || October 18, 2003 || Anderson Mesa || LONEOS || HEN || align=right | 1.7 km || 
|-id=493 bgcolor=#E9E9E9
| 170493 ||  || — || October 21, 2003 || Kitt Peak || Spacewatch || — || align=right | 1.3 km || 
|-id=494 bgcolor=#fefefe
| 170494 ||  || — || November 14, 2003 || Palomar || NEAT || — || align=right | 1.6 km || 
|-id=495 bgcolor=#E9E9E9
| 170495 ||  || — || November 15, 2003 || Palomar || NEAT || — || align=right | 1.6 km || 
|-id=496 bgcolor=#E9E9E9
| 170496 ||  || — || November 15, 2003 || Palomar || NEAT || MAR || align=right | 2.0 km || 
|-id=497 bgcolor=#E9E9E9
| 170497 ||  || — || November 16, 2003 || Catalina || CSS || — || align=right | 3.6 km || 
|-id=498 bgcolor=#E9E9E9
| 170498 ||  || — || November 18, 2003 || Palomar || NEAT || — || align=right | 4.0 km || 
|-id=499 bgcolor=#E9E9E9
| 170499 ||  || — || November 18, 2003 || Palomar || NEAT || — || align=right | 4.3 km || 
|-id=500 bgcolor=#E9E9E9
| 170500 ||  || — || November 16, 2003 || Kitt Peak || Spacewatch || — || align=right | 1.5 km || 
|}

170501–170600 

|-bgcolor=#E9E9E9
| 170501 ||  || — || November 18, 2003 || Palomar || NEAT || — || align=right | 1.6 km || 
|-id=502 bgcolor=#FFC2E0
| 170502 ||  || — || November 18, 2003 || Palomar || NEAT || APO +1km || align=right | 1.3 km || 
|-id=503 bgcolor=#E9E9E9
| 170503 ||  || — || November 18, 2003 || Kitt Peak || Spacewatch || — || align=right | 4.4 km || 
|-id=504 bgcolor=#fefefe
| 170504 ||  || — || November 16, 2003 || Kitt Peak || Spacewatch || NYS || align=right data-sort-value="0.98" | 980 m || 
|-id=505 bgcolor=#fefefe
| 170505 ||  || — || November 16, 2003 || Kitt Peak || Spacewatch || NYS || align=right | 1.3 km || 
|-id=506 bgcolor=#E9E9E9
| 170506 ||  || — || November 16, 2003 || Kitt Peak || Spacewatch || — || align=right | 1.3 km || 
|-id=507 bgcolor=#E9E9E9
| 170507 ||  || — || November 19, 2003 || Powell || Powell Obs. || — || align=right | 2.0 km || 
|-id=508 bgcolor=#E9E9E9
| 170508 ||  || — || November 18, 2003 || Kitt Peak || Spacewatch || — || align=right | 2.5 km || 
|-id=509 bgcolor=#E9E9E9
| 170509 ||  || — || November 18, 2003 || Kitt Peak || Spacewatch || MAR || align=right | 1.9 km || 
|-id=510 bgcolor=#d6d6d6
| 170510 ||  || — || November 19, 2003 || Kitt Peak || Spacewatch || — || align=right | 4.3 km || 
|-id=511 bgcolor=#E9E9E9
| 170511 ||  || — || November 19, 2003 || Kitt Peak || Spacewatch || — || align=right | 1.5 km || 
|-id=512 bgcolor=#E9E9E9
| 170512 ||  || — || November 20, 2003 || Socorro || LINEAR || — || align=right | 2.4 km || 
|-id=513 bgcolor=#E9E9E9
| 170513 ||  || — || November 20, 2003 || Socorro || LINEAR || — || align=right | 3.9 km || 
|-id=514 bgcolor=#E9E9E9
| 170514 ||  || — || November 20, 2003 || Socorro || LINEAR || — || align=right | 1.7 km || 
|-id=515 bgcolor=#E9E9E9
| 170515 ||  || — || November 18, 2003 || Kitt Peak || Spacewatch || — || align=right | 1.5 km || 
|-id=516 bgcolor=#fefefe
| 170516 ||  || — || November 18, 2003 || Kitt Peak || Spacewatch || — || align=right | 1.4 km || 
|-id=517 bgcolor=#E9E9E9
| 170517 ||  || — || November 18, 2003 || Kitt Peak || Spacewatch || — || align=right | 3.6 km || 
|-id=518 bgcolor=#E9E9E9
| 170518 ||  || — || November 19, 2003 || Kitt Peak || Spacewatch || — || align=right | 1.6 km || 
|-id=519 bgcolor=#E9E9E9
| 170519 ||  || — || November 19, 2003 || Kitt Peak || Spacewatch || — || align=right | 1.5 km || 
|-id=520 bgcolor=#E9E9E9
| 170520 ||  || — || November 20, 2003 || Socorro || LINEAR || — || align=right | 3.7 km || 
|-id=521 bgcolor=#fefefe
| 170521 ||  || — || November 20, 2003 || Socorro || LINEAR || — || align=right | 1.5 km || 
|-id=522 bgcolor=#E9E9E9
| 170522 ||  || — || November 20, 2003 || Socorro || LINEAR || EUN || align=right | 3.7 km || 
|-id=523 bgcolor=#E9E9E9
| 170523 ||  || — || November 19, 2003 || Palomar || NEAT || — || align=right | 3.2 km || 
|-id=524 bgcolor=#E9E9E9
| 170524 ||  || — || November 20, 2003 || Socorro || LINEAR || — || align=right | 4.1 km || 
|-id=525 bgcolor=#fefefe
| 170525 ||  || — || November 20, 2003 || Socorro || LINEAR || — || align=right | 1.8 km || 
|-id=526 bgcolor=#E9E9E9
| 170526 ||  || — || November 16, 2003 || Catalina || CSS || — || align=right | 2.1 km || 
|-id=527 bgcolor=#E9E9E9
| 170527 ||  || — || November 16, 2003 || Catalina || CSS || EUN || align=right | 2.7 km || 
|-id=528 bgcolor=#E9E9E9
| 170528 ||  || — || November 18, 2003 || Kitt Peak || Spacewatch || — || align=right | 2.3 km || 
|-id=529 bgcolor=#fefefe
| 170529 ||  || — || November 19, 2003 || Anderson Mesa || LONEOS || — || align=right | 2.5 km || 
|-id=530 bgcolor=#E9E9E9
| 170530 ||  || — || November 19, 2003 || Anderson Mesa || LONEOS || — || align=right | 1.9 km || 
|-id=531 bgcolor=#fefefe
| 170531 ||  || — || November 19, 2003 || Anderson Mesa || LONEOS || V || align=right | 1.2 km || 
|-id=532 bgcolor=#E9E9E9
| 170532 ||  || — || November 19, 2003 || Anderson Mesa || LONEOS || — || align=right | 1.8 km || 
|-id=533 bgcolor=#E9E9E9
| 170533 ||  || — || November 19, 2003 || Anderson Mesa || LONEOS || — || align=right | 2.7 km || 
|-id=534 bgcolor=#E9E9E9
| 170534 ||  || — || November 21, 2003 || Socorro || LINEAR || — || align=right | 1.2 km || 
|-id=535 bgcolor=#E9E9E9
| 170535 ||  || — || November 21, 2003 || Socorro || LINEAR || — || align=right | 1.8 km || 
|-id=536 bgcolor=#E9E9E9
| 170536 ||  || — || November 20, 2003 || Socorro || LINEAR || MAR || align=right | 1.6 km || 
|-id=537 bgcolor=#E9E9E9
| 170537 ||  || — || November 20, 2003 || Socorro || LINEAR || — || align=right | 3.0 km || 
|-id=538 bgcolor=#E9E9E9
| 170538 ||  || — || November 20, 2003 || Socorro || LINEAR || — || align=right | 1.5 km || 
|-id=539 bgcolor=#E9E9E9
| 170539 ||  || — || November 20, 2003 || Socorro || LINEAR || — || align=right | 1.6 km || 
|-id=540 bgcolor=#E9E9E9
| 170540 ||  || — || November 20, 2003 || Socorro || LINEAR || — || align=right | 2.5 km || 
|-id=541 bgcolor=#d6d6d6
| 170541 ||  || — || November 20, 2003 || Socorro || LINEAR || TEL || align=right | 2.7 km || 
|-id=542 bgcolor=#E9E9E9
| 170542 ||  || — || November 20, 2003 || Socorro || LINEAR || — || align=right | 2.5 km || 
|-id=543 bgcolor=#E9E9E9
| 170543 ||  || — || November 20, 2003 || Socorro || LINEAR || — || align=right | 2.4 km || 
|-id=544 bgcolor=#E9E9E9
| 170544 ||  || — || November 20, 2003 || Socorro || LINEAR || — || align=right | 2.5 km || 
|-id=545 bgcolor=#E9E9E9
| 170545 ||  || — || November 20, 2003 || Socorro || LINEAR || — || align=right | 1.8 km || 
|-id=546 bgcolor=#E9E9E9
| 170546 ||  || — || November 20, 2003 || Socorro || LINEAR || — || align=right | 3.5 km || 
|-id=547 bgcolor=#E9E9E9
| 170547 ||  || — || November 20, 2003 || Socorro || LINEAR || EUN || align=right | 1.9 km || 
|-id=548 bgcolor=#E9E9E9
| 170548 ||  || — || November 20, 2003 || Socorro || LINEAR || — || align=right | 4.6 km || 
|-id=549 bgcolor=#E9E9E9
| 170549 ||  || — || November 21, 2003 || Socorro || LINEAR || MAR || align=right | 2.0 km || 
|-id=550 bgcolor=#fefefe
| 170550 ||  || — || November 21, 2003 || Socorro || LINEAR || V || align=right | 1.2 km || 
|-id=551 bgcolor=#E9E9E9
| 170551 ||  || — || November 21, 2003 || Socorro || LINEAR || — || align=right | 2.1 km || 
|-id=552 bgcolor=#E9E9E9
| 170552 ||  || — || November 21, 2003 || Socorro || LINEAR || JUN || align=right | 2.1 km || 
|-id=553 bgcolor=#E9E9E9
| 170553 ||  || — || November 21, 2003 || Socorro || LINEAR || MAR || align=right | 1.7 km || 
|-id=554 bgcolor=#E9E9E9
| 170554 ||  || — || November 21, 2003 || Socorro || LINEAR || — || align=right | 2.6 km || 
|-id=555 bgcolor=#E9E9E9
| 170555 ||  || — || November 21, 2003 || Socorro || LINEAR || ADE || align=right | 5.0 km || 
|-id=556 bgcolor=#E9E9E9
| 170556 ||  || — || November 21, 2003 || Socorro || LINEAR || MIT || align=right | 4.5 km || 
|-id=557 bgcolor=#E9E9E9
| 170557 ||  || — || November 23, 2003 || Socorro || LINEAR || — || align=right | 1.6 km || 
|-id=558 bgcolor=#E9E9E9
| 170558 ||  || — || November 23, 2003 || Kitt Peak || Spacewatch || — || align=right | 2.2 km || 
|-id=559 bgcolor=#E9E9E9
| 170559 ||  || — || November 24, 2003 || Anderson Mesa || LONEOS || — || align=right | 1.5 km || 
|-id=560 bgcolor=#E9E9E9
| 170560 ||  || — || November 24, 2003 || Anderson Mesa || LONEOS || — || align=right | 2.0 km || 
|-id=561 bgcolor=#E9E9E9
| 170561 ||  || — || November 26, 2003 || Kitt Peak || Spacewatch || — || align=right | 1.8 km || 
|-id=562 bgcolor=#E9E9E9
| 170562 ||  || — || November 26, 2003 || Kitt Peak || Spacewatch || EUN || align=right | 3.7 km || 
|-id=563 bgcolor=#fefefe
| 170563 ||  || — || November 30, 2003 || Kitt Peak || Spacewatch || MAS || align=right | 1.0 km || 
|-id=564 bgcolor=#fefefe
| 170564 ||  || — || November 30, 2003 || Kitt Peak || Spacewatch || NYS || align=right | 1.9 km || 
|-id=565 bgcolor=#E9E9E9
| 170565 ||  || — || November 19, 2003 || Socorro || LINEAR || — || align=right | 3.8 km || 
|-id=566 bgcolor=#E9E9E9
| 170566 ||  || — || November 23, 2003 || Anderson Mesa || LONEOS || — || align=right | 1.9 km || 
|-id=567 bgcolor=#fefefe
| 170567 ||  || — || November 19, 2003 || Kitt Peak || Spacewatch || MAS || align=right | 1.1 km || 
|-id=568 bgcolor=#fefefe
| 170568 ||  || — || November 26, 2003 || Socorro || LINEAR || — || align=right | 1.8 km || 
|-id=569 bgcolor=#E9E9E9
| 170569 ||  || — || November 24, 2003 || Anderson Mesa || LONEOS || — || align=right | 1.6 km || 
|-id=570 bgcolor=#fefefe
| 170570 ||  || — || December 1, 2003 || Socorro || LINEAR || — || align=right | 1.4 km || 
|-id=571 bgcolor=#fefefe
| 170571 ||  || — || December 1, 2003 || Socorro || LINEAR || MAS || align=right | 1.5 km || 
|-id=572 bgcolor=#fefefe
| 170572 ||  || — || December 3, 2003 || Anderson Mesa || LONEOS || V || align=right | 1.2 km || 
|-id=573 bgcolor=#E9E9E9
| 170573 ||  || — || December 3, 2003 || Socorro || LINEAR || — || align=right | 2.0 km || 
|-id=574 bgcolor=#fefefe
| 170574 ||  || — || December 3, 2003 || Anderson Mesa || LONEOS || — || align=right | 2.2 km || 
|-id=575 bgcolor=#E9E9E9
| 170575 ||  || — || December 4, 2003 || Socorro || LINEAR || HNS || align=right | 2.2 km || 
|-id=576 bgcolor=#E9E9E9
| 170576 ||  || — || December 4, 2003 || Socorro || LINEAR || — || align=right | 5.1 km || 
|-id=577 bgcolor=#fefefe
| 170577 ||  || — || December 3, 2003 || Socorro || LINEAR || — || align=right | 1.8 km || 
|-id=578 bgcolor=#E9E9E9
| 170578 ||  || — || December 14, 2003 || Palomar || NEAT || MIS || align=right | 3.2 km || 
|-id=579 bgcolor=#E9E9E9
| 170579 ||  || — || December 1, 2003 || Socorro || LINEAR || — || align=right | 3.4 km || 
|-id=580 bgcolor=#E9E9E9
| 170580 ||  || — || December 15, 2003 || Needville || J. Dellinger || — || align=right | 2.5 km || 
|-id=581 bgcolor=#fefefe
| 170581 ||  || — || December 14, 2003 || Kitt Peak || Spacewatch || V || align=right | 1.2 km || 
|-id=582 bgcolor=#fefefe
| 170582 ||  || — || December 13, 2003 || Catalina || CSS || PHO || align=right | 2.0 km || 
|-id=583 bgcolor=#E9E9E9
| 170583 ||  || — || December 14, 2003 || Palomar || NEAT || — || align=right | 1.9 km || 
|-id=584 bgcolor=#E9E9E9
| 170584 ||  || — || December 14, 2003 || Socorro || LINEAR || — || align=right | 2.1 km || 
|-id=585 bgcolor=#E9E9E9
| 170585 ||  || — || December 1, 2003 || Kitt Peak || Spacewatch || — || align=right | 1.3 km || 
|-id=586 bgcolor=#E9E9E9
| 170586 ||  || — || December 1, 2003 || Socorro || LINEAR || PAD || align=right | 3.6 km || 
|-id=587 bgcolor=#E9E9E9
| 170587 ||  || — || December 1, 2003 || Kitt Peak || Spacewatch || — || align=right | 2.4 km || 
|-id=588 bgcolor=#E9E9E9
| 170588 ||  || — || December 4, 2003 || Socorro || LINEAR || EUN || align=right | 2.1 km || 
|-id=589 bgcolor=#E9E9E9
| 170589 ||  || — || December 14, 2003 || Kitt Peak || Spacewatch || — || align=right | 1.3 km || 
|-id=590 bgcolor=#E9E9E9
| 170590 ||  || — || December 1, 2003 || Socorro || LINEAR || — || align=right | 1.6 km || 
|-id=591 bgcolor=#E9E9E9
| 170591 ||  || — || December 17, 2003 || Socorro || LINEAR || — || align=right | 2.7 km || 
|-id=592 bgcolor=#E9E9E9
| 170592 ||  || — || December 16, 2003 || Kitt Peak || Spacewatch || HOF || align=right | 4.5 km || 
|-id=593 bgcolor=#E9E9E9
| 170593 ||  || — || December 17, 2003 || Socorro || LINEAR || — || align=right | 3.1 km || 
|-id=594 bgcolor=#E9E9E9
| 170594 ||  || — || December 17, 2003 || Socorro || LINEAR || EUN || align=right | 2.3 km || 
|-id=595 bgcolor=#E9E9E9
| 170595 ||  || — || December 17, 2003 || Socorro || LINEAR || — || align=right | 4.5 km || 
|-id=596 bgcolor=#E9E9E9
| 170596 ||  || — || December 17, 2003 || Kitt Peak || Spacewatch || — || align=right | 3.8 km || 
|-id=597 bgcolor=#E9E9E9
| 170597 ||  || — || December 17, 2003 || Kitt Peak || Spacewatch || HOF || align=right | 5.8 km || 
|-id=598 bgcolor=#E9E9E9
| 170598 ||  || — || December 17, 2003 || Kitt Peak || Spacewatch || WIT || align=right | 1.7 km || 
|-id=599 bgcolor=#E9E9E9
| 170599 ||  || — || December 17, 2003 || Anderson Mesa || LONEOS || — || align=right | 2.2 km || 
|-id=600 bgcolor=#fefefe
| 170600 ||  || — || December 18, 2003 || Socorro || LINEAR || — || align=right | 1.3 km || 
|}

170601–170700 

|-bgcolor=#E9E9E9
| 170601 ||  || — || December 18, 2003 || Socorro || LINEAR || — || align=right | 2.6 km || 
|-id=602 bgcolor=#E9E9E9
| 170602 ||  || — || December 18, 2003 || Socorro || LINEAR || MIT || align=right | 5.7 km || 
|-id=603 bgcolor=#E9E9E9
| 170603 ||  || — || December 17, 2003 || Kitt Peak || Spacewatch || — || align=right | 2.6 km || 
|-id=604 bgcolor=#E9E9E9
| 170604 ||  || — || December 18, 2003 || Kitt Peak || Spacewatch || — || align=right | 1.8 km || 
|-id=605 bgcolor=#E9E9E9
| 170605 ||  || — || December 18, 2003 || Socorro || LINEAR || — || align=right | 2.5 km || 
|-id=606 bgcolor=#E9E9E9
| 170606 ||  || — || December 16, 2003 || Kitt Peak || Spacewatch || — || align=right | 2.4 km || 
|-id=607 bgcolor=#E9E9E9
| 170607 ||  || — || December 19, 2003 || Socorro || LINEAR || — || align=right | 1.6 km || 
|-id=608 bgcolor=#E9E9E9
| 170608 ||  || — || December 19, 2003 || Kitt Peak || Spacewatch || — || align=right | 2.2 km || 
|-id=609 bgcolor=#d6d6d6
| 170609 ||  || — || December 19, 2003 || Kitt Peak || Spacewatch || — || align=right | 3.4 km || 
|-id=610 bgcolor=#E9E9E9
| 170610 ||  || — || December 19, 2003 || Kitt Peak || Spacewatch || AGN || align=right | 2.0 km || 
|-id=611 bgcolor=#E9E9E9
| 170611 ||  || — || December 17, 2003 || Kitt Peak || Spacewatch || — || align=right | 1.6 km || 
|-id=612 bgcolor=#E9E9E9
| 170612 ||  || — || December 17, 2003 || Kitt Peak || Spacewatch || — || align=right | 2.6 km || 
|-id=613 bgcolor=#E9E9E9
| 170613 ||  || — || December 18, 2003 || Socorro || LINEAR || — || align=right | 2.9 km || 
|-id=614 bgcolor=#E9E9E9
| 170614 ||  || — || December 18, 2003 || Socorro || LINEAR || — || align=right | 2.4 km || 
|-id=615 bgcolor=#E9E9E9
| 170615 ||  || — || December 18, 2003 || Socorro || LINEAR || — || align=right | 2.5 km || 
|-id=616 bgcolor=#E9E9E9
| 170616 ||  || — || December 18, 2003 || Socorro || LINEAR || EUN || align=right | 2.0 km || 
|-id=617 bgcolor=#E9E9E9
| 170617 ||  || — || December 18, 2003 || Socorro || LINEAR || — || align=right | 2.4 km || 
|-id=618 bgcolor=#E9E9E9
| 170618 ||  || — || December 18, 2003 || Socorro || LINEAR || — || align=right | 3.8 km || 
|-id=619 bgcolor=#E9E9E9
| 170619 ||  || — || December 18, 2003 || Socorro || LINEAR || AGN || align=right | 2.2 km || 
|-id=620 bgcolor=#fefefe
| 170620 ||  || — || December 18, 2003 || Socorro || LINEAR || V || align=right | 1.5 km || 
|-id=621 bgcolor=#E9E9E9
| 170621 ||  || — || December 18, 2003 || Socorro || LINEAR || — || align=right | 2.5 km || 
|-id=622 bgcolor=#E9E9E9
| 170622 ||  || — || December 19, 2003 || Socorro || LINEAR || ADE || align=right | 4.1 km || 
|-id=623 bgcolor=#E9E9E9
| 170623 ||  || — || December 19, 2003 || Socorro || LINEAR || EUN || align=right | 2.2 km || 
|-id=624 bgcolor=#E9E9E9
| 170624 ||  || — || December 19, 2003 || Socorro || LINEAR || — || align=right | 2.7 km || 
|-id=625 bgcolor=#E9E9E9
| 170625 ||  || — || December 19, 2003 || Socorro || LINEAR || — || align=right | 1.8 km || 
|-id=626 bgcolor=#E9E9E9
| 170626 ||  || — || December 19, 2003 || Socorro || LINEAR || — || align=right | 2.4 km || 
|-id=627 bgcolor=#E9E9E9
| 170627 ||  || — || December 19, 2003 || Socorro || LINEAR || — || align=right | 4.2 km || 
|-id=628 bgcolor=#E9E9E9
| 170628 ||  || — || December 19, 2003 || Socorro || LINEAR || — || align=right | 4.1 km || 
|-id=629 bgcolor=#E9E9E9
| 170629 ||  || — || December 20, 2003 || Socorro || LINEAR || — || align=right | 2.4 km || 
|-id=630 bgcolor=#E9E9E9
| 170630 ||  || — || December 19, 2003 || Socorro || LINEAR || — || align=right | 2.7 km || 
|-id=631 bgcolor=#E9E9E9
| 170631 ||  || — || December 21, 2003 || Socorro || LINEAR || — || align=right | 2.0 km || 
|-id=632 bgcolor=#E9E9E9
| 170632 ||  || — || December 21, 2003 || Haleakala || NEAT || — || align=right | 3.8 km || 
|-id=633 bgcolor=#d6d6d6
| 170633 ||  || — || December 18, 2003 || Socorro || LINEAR || — || align=right | 4.0 km || 
|-id=634 bgcolor=#E9E9E9
| 170634 ||  || — || December 18, 2003 || Socorro || LINEAR || WIT || align=right | 1.7 km || 
|-id=635 bgcolor=#E9E9E9
| 170635 ||  || — || December 18, 2003 || Socorro || LINEAR || — || align=right | 1.6 km || 
|-id=636 bgcolor=#E9E9E9
| 170636 ||  || — || December 18, 2003 || Socorro || LINEAR || — || align=right | 2.7 km || 
|-id=637 bgcolor=#E9E9E9
| 170637 ||  || — || December 18, 2003 || Socorro || LINEAR || — || align=right | 4.1 km || 
|-id=638 bgcolor=#fefefe
| 170638 ||  || — || December 18, 2003 || Socorro || LINEAR || V || align=right | 1.2 km || 
|-id=639 bgcolor=#E9E9E9
| 170639 ||  || — || December 19, 2003 || Kitt Peak || Spacewatch || — || align=right | 1.5 km || 
|-id=640 bgcolor=#E9E9E9
| 170640 ||  || — || December 21, 2003 || Socorro || LINEAR || GEF || align=right | 2.2 km || 
|-id=641 bgcolor=#d6d6d6
| 170641 ||  || — || December 21, 2003 || Kitt Peak || Spacewatch || — || align=right | 4.5 km || 
|-id=642 bgcolor=#E9E9E9
| 170642 ||  || — || December 19, 2003 || Socorro || LINEAR || ADE || align=right | 4.3 km || 
|-id=643 bgcolor=#E9E9E9
| 170643 ||  || — || December 19, 2003 || Socorro || LINEAR || — || align=right | 2.3 km || 
|-id=644 bgcolor=#d6d6d6
| 170644 Tepliczky||  || — || December 25, 2003 || Piszkéstető || K. Sárneczky || EOS || align=right | 2.9 km || 
|-id=645 bgcolor=#E9E9E9
| 170645 ||  || — || December 22, 2003 || Socorro || LINEAR || — || align=right | 2.2 km || 
|-id=646 bgcolor=#E9E9E9
| 170646 ||  || — || December 23, 2003 || Socorro || LINEAR || — || align=right | 1.5 km || 
|-id=647 bgcolor=#E9E9E9
| 170647 ||  || — || December 23, 2003 || Socorro || LINEAR || — || align=right | 4.7 km || 
|-id=648 bgcolor=#FA8072
| 170648 ||  || — || December 24, 2003 || Črni Vrh || Črni Vrh || — || align=right | 1.2 km || 
|-id=649 bgcolor=#E9E9E9
| 170649 ||  || — || December 25, 2003 || Kitt Peak || Spacewatch || — || align=right | 1.1 km || 
|-id=650 bgcolor=#E9E9E9
| 170650 ||  || — || December 25, 2003 || Haleakala || NEAT || — || align=right | 4.3 km || 
|-id=651 bgcolor=#E9E9E9
| 170651 ||  || — || December 25, 2003 || Haleakala || NEAT || — || align=right | 2.8 km || 
|-id=652 bgcolor=#E9E9E9
| 170652 ||  || — || December 27, 2003 || Socorro || LINEAR || — || align=right | 1.8 km || 
|-id=653 bgcolor=#E9E9E9
| 170653 ||  || — || December 27, 2003 || Socorro || LINEAR || — || align=right | 1.6 km || 
|-id=654 bgcolor=#E9E9E9
| 170654 ||  || — || December 27, 2003 || Socorro || LINEAR || — || align=right | 3.9 km || 
|-id=655 bgcolor=#E9E9E9
| 170655 ||  || — || December 27, 2003 || Socorro || LINEAR || — || align=right | 4.8 km || 
|-id=656 bgcolor=#E9E9E9
| 170656 ||  || — || December 28, 2003 || Socorro || LINEAR || — || align=right | 1.6 km || 
|-id=657 bgcolor=#E9E9E9
| 170657 ||  || — || December 28, 2003 || Socorro || LINEAR || — || align=right | 3.7 km || 
|-id=658 bgcolor=#E9E9E9
| 170658 ||  || — || December 28, 2003 || Socorro || LINEAR || — || align=right | 3.7 km || 
|-id=659 bgcolor=#E9E9E9
| 170659 ||  || — || December 28, 2003 || Socorro || LINEAR || — || align=right | 2.3 km || 
|-id=660 bgcolor=#E9E9E9
| 170660 ||  || — || December 27, 2003 || Socorro || LINEAR || GEF || align=right | 2.1 km || 
|-id=661 bgcolor=#E9E9E9
| 170661 ||  || — || December 27, 2003 || Socorro || LINEAR || AGN || align=right | 2.1 km || 
|-id=662 bgcolor=#E9E9E9
| 170662 ||  || — || December 28, 2003 || Socorro || LINEAR || EUN || align=right | 2.5 km || 
|-id=663 bgcolor=#E9E9E9
| 170663 ||  || — || December 28, 2003 || Socorro || LINEAR || — || align=right | 4.2 km || 
|-id=664 bgcolor=#E9E9E9
| 170664 ||  || — || December 28, 2003 || Socorro || LINEAR || — || align=right | 3.6 km || 
|-id=665 bgcolor=#E9E9E9
| 170665 ||  || — || December 29, 2003 || Socorro || LINEAR || ADE || align=right | 3.1 km || 
|-id=666 bgcolor=#E9E9E9
| 170666 ||  || — || December 29, 2003 || Socorro || LINEAR || EUN || align=right | 2.6 km || 
|-id=667 bgcolor=#d6d6d6
| 170667 ||  || — || December 29, 2003 || Kitt Peak || Spacewatch || — || align=right | 4.9 km || 
|-id=668 bgcolor=#E9E9E9
| 170668 ||  || — || December 26, 2003 || Haleakala || NEAT || — || align=right | 3.3 km || 
|-id=669 bgcolor=#E9E9E9
| 170669 ||  || — || December 17, 2003 || Socorro || LINEAR || — || align=right | 2.9 km || 
|-id=670 bgcolor=#E9E9E9
| 170670 ||  || — || December 17, 2003 || Kitt Peak || Spacewatch || — || align=right | 2.0 km || 
|-id=671 bgcolor=#E9E9E9
| 170671 ||  || — || December 18, 2003 || Socorro || LINEAR || — || align=right | 4.2 km || 
|-id=672 bgcolor=#E9E9E9
| 170672 ||  || — || December 18, 2003 || Kitt Peak || Spacewatch || ADE || align=right | 5.1 km || 
|-id=673 bgcolor=#E9E9E9
| 170673 ||  || — || December 19, 2003 || Kitt Peak || Spacewatch || — || align=right | 3.5 km || 
|-id=674 bgcolor=#E9E9E9
| 170674 ||  || — || December 19, 2003 || Socorro || LINEAR || — || align=right | 2.9 km || 
|-id=675 bgcolor=#fefefe
| 170675 ||  || — || December 19, 2003 || Socorro || LINEAR || — || align=right | 1.8 km || 
|-id=676 bgcolor=#E9E9E9
| 170676 ||  || — || December 18, 2003 || Socorro || LINEAR || — || align=right | 1.8 km || 
|-id=677 bgcolor=#d6d6d6
| 170677 ||  || — || December 28, 2003 || Socorro || LINEAR || — || align=right | 5.1 km || 
|-id=678 bgcolor=#d6d6d6
| 170678 ||  || — || December 28, 2003 || Kitt Peak || Spacewatch || — || align=right | 2.8 km || 
|-id=679 bgcolor=#E9E9E9
| 170679 ||  || — || January 7, 2004 || Haleakala || NEAT || — || align=right | 3.1 km || 
|-id=680 bgcolor=#E9E9E9
| 170680 ||  || — || January 13, 2004 || Palomar || NEAT || — || align=right | 3.6 km || 
|-id=681 bgcolor=#E9E9E9
| 170681 ||  || — || January 13, 2004 || Anderson Mesa || LONEOS || — || align=right | 5.1 km || 
|-id=682 bgcolor=#E9E9E9
| 170682 ||  || — || January 13, 2004 || Anderson Mesa || LONEOS || DOR || align=right | 3.6 km || 
|-id=683 bgcolor=#d6d6d6
| 170683 ||  || — || January 13, 2004 || Anderson Mesa || LONEOS || — || align=right | 3.0 km || 
|-id=684 bgcolor=#fefefe
| 170684 ||  || — || January 13, 2004 || Anderson Mesa || LONEOS || — || align=right | 2.2 km || 
|-id=685 bgcolor=#E9E9E9
| 170685 ||  || — || January 14, 2004 || Palomar || NEAT || — || align=right | 3.1 km || 
|-id=686 bgcolor=#E9E9E9
| 170686 ||  || — || January 15, 2004 || Kitt Peak || Spacewatch || — || align=right | 3.4 km || 
|-id=687 bgcolor=#E9E9E9
| 170687 ||  || — || January 15, 2004 || Kitt Peak || Spacewatch || — || align=right | 3.1 km || 
|-id=688 bgcolor=#E9E9E9
| 170688 ||  || — || January 16, 2004 || Kitt Peak || Spacewatch || — || align=right | 1.5 km || 
|-id=689 bgcolor=#d6d6d6
| 170689 ||  || — || January 16, 2004 || Palomar || NEAT || — || align=right | 4.1 km || 
|-id=690 bgcolor=#fefefe
| 170690 ||  || — || January 16, 2004 || Palomar || NEAT || — || align=right | 1.4 km || 
|-id=691 bgcolor=#E9E9E9
| 170691 ||  || — || January 16, 2004 || Palomar || NEAT || — || align=right | 3.1 km || 
|-id=692 bgcolor=#d6d6d6
| 170692 ||  || — || January 16, 2004 || Palomar || NEAT || HYG || align=right | 5.0 km || 
|-id=693 bgcolor=#E9E9E9
| 170693 ||  || — || January 17, 2004 || Haleakala || NEAT || — || align=right | 2.8 km || 
|-id=694 bgcolor=#fefefe
| 170694 ||  || — || January 16, 2004 || Palomar || NEAT || NYS || align=right | 1.3 km || 
|-id=695 bgcolor=#E9E9E9
| 170695 ||  || — || January 18, 2004 || Palomar || NEAT || — || align=right | 2.7 km || 
|-id=696 bgcolor=#E9E9E9
| 170696 ||  || — || January 18, 2004 || Goodricke-Pigott || R. A. Tucker || — || align=right | 4.5 km || 
|-id=697 bgcolor=#d6d6d6
| 170697 ||  || — || January 16, 2004 || Kitt Peak || Spacewatch || — || align=right | 3.8 km || 
|-id=698 bgcolor=#d6d6d6
| 170698 ||  || — || January 17, 2004 || Palomar || NEAT || — || align=right | 3.9 km || 
|-id=699 bgcolor=#d6d6d6
| 170699 ||  || — || January 18, 2004 || Palomar || NEAT || — || align=right | 3.3 km || 
|-id=700 bgcolor=#fefefe
| 170700 Marygoldaross ||  ||  || January 19, 2004 || Anderson Mesa || LONEOS || NYS || align=right data-sort-value="0.95" | 950 m || 
|}

170701–170800 

|-bgcolor=#d6d6d6
| 170701 ||  || — || January 19, 2004 || Kitt Peak || Spacewatch || KOR || align=right | 1.9 km || 
|-id=702 bgcolor=#E9E9E9
| 170702 ||  || — || January 19, 2004 || Catalina || CSS || — || align=right | 4.8 km || 
|-id=703 bgcolor=#E9E9E9
| 170703 ||  || — || January 18, 2004 || Needville || J. Dellinger || — || align=right | 3.1 km || 
|-id=704 bgcolor=#E9E9E9
| 170704 ||  || — || January 18, 2004 || Palomar || NEAT || — || align=right | 2.0 km || 
|-id=705 bgcolor=#d6d6d6
| 170705 ||  || — || January 18, 2004 || Palomar || NEAT || THM || align=right | 3.7 km || 
|-id=706 bgcolor=#d6d6d6
| 170706 ||  || — || January 18, 2004 || Palomar || NEAT || — || align=right | 4.7 km || 
|-id=707 bgcolor=#E9E9E9
| 170707 ||  || — || January 19, 2004 || Anderson Mesa || LONEOS || — || align=right | 3.3 km || 
|-id=708 bgcolor=#d6d6d6
| 170708 ||  || — || January 19, 2004 || Kitt Peak || Spacewatch || — || align=right | 4.4 km || 
|-id=709 bgcolor=#d6d6d6
| 170709 ||  || — || January 19, 2004 || Kitt Peak || Spacewatch || — || align=right | 3.0 km || 
|-id=710 bgcolor=#d6d6d6
| 170710 ||  || — || January 19, 2004 || Catalina || CSS || — || align=right | 4.9 km || 
|-id=711 bgcolor=#E9E9E9
| 170711 ||  || — || January 21, 2004 || Socorro || LINEAR || AGN || align=right | 2.2 km || 
|-id=712 bgcolor=#d6d6d6
| 170712 ||  || — || January 19, 2004 || Catalina || CSS || — || align=right | 6.9 km || 
|-id=713 bgcolor=#E9E9E9
| 170713 ||  || — || January 22, 2004 || Socorro || LINEAR || — || align=right | 2.5 km || 
|-id=714 bgcolor=#E9E9E9
| 170714 ||  || — || January 22, 2004 || Socorro || LINEAR || IAN || align=right | 1.6 km || 
|-id=715 bgcolor=#d6d6d6
| 170715 ||  || — || January 21, 2004 || Socorro || LINEAR || — || align=right | 5.4 km || 
|-id=716 bgcolor=#d6d6d6
| 170716 ||  || — || January 21, 2004 || Socorro || LINEAR || — || align=right | 4.4 km || 
|-id=717 bgcolor=#E9E9E9
| 170717 ||  || — || January 21, 2004 || Socorro || LINEAR || WIT || align=right | 1.7 km || 
|-id=718 bgcolor=#E9E9E9
| 170718 ||  || — || January 21, 2004 || Socorro || LINEAR || — || align=right | 3.1 km || 
|-id=719 bgcolor=#d6d6d6
| 170719 ||  || — || January 21, 2004 || Socorro || LINEAR || — || align=right | 3.2 km || 
|-id=720 bgcolor=#d6d6d6
| 170720 ||  || — || January 21, 2004 || Socorro || LINEAR || KOR || align=right | 1.9 km || 
|-id=721 bgcolor=#E9E9E9
| 170721 ||  || — || January 21, 2004 || Socorro || LINEAR || — || align=right | 3.7 km || 
|-id=722 bgcolor=#E9E9E9
| 170722 ||  || — || January 22, 2004 || Socorro || LINEAR || HOF || align=right | 3.5 km || 
|-id=723 bgcolor=#d6d6d6
| 170723 ||  || — || January 23, 2004 || Socorro || LINEAR || — || align=right | 4.8 km || 
|-id=724 bgcolor=#E9E9E9
| 170724 ||  || — || January 24, 2004 || Socorro || LINEAR || — || align=right | 1.7 km || 
|-id=725 bgcolor=#E9E9E9
| 170725 ||  || — || January 23, 2004 || Socorro || LINEAR || — || align=right | 3.6 km || 
|-id=726 bgcolor=#d6d6d6
| 170726 ||  || — || January 24, 2004 || Socorro || LINEAR || — || align=right | 4.1 km || 
|-id=727 bgcolor=#d6d6d6
| 170727 ||  || — || January 24, 2004 || Socorro || LINEAR || HYG || align=right | 5.5 km || 
|-id=728 bgcolor=#d6d6d6
| 170728 ||  || — || January 24, 2004 || Socorro || LINEAR || — || align=right | 3.8 km || 
|-id=729 bgcolor=#d6d6d6
| 170729 ||  || — || January 23, 2004 || Socorro || LINEAR || — || align=right | 4.7 km || 
|-id=730 bgcolor=#d6d6d6
| 170730 ||  || — || January 22, 2004 || Palomar || NEAT || EOS || align=right | 3.4 km || 
|-id=731 bgcolor=#E9E9E9
| 170731 ||  || — || January 28, 2004 || Socorro || LINEAR || — || align=right | 4.4 km || 
|-id=732 bgcolor=#d6d6d6
| 170732 ||  || — || January 23, 2004 || Socorro || LINEAR || — || align=right | 4.2 km || 
|-id=733 bgcolor=#d6d6d6
| 170733 ||  || — || January 24, 2004 || Socorro || LINEAR || — || align=right | 7.2 km || 
|-id=734 bgcolor=#E9E9E9
| 170734 ||  || — || January 24, 2004 || Socorro || LINEAR || MIT || align=right | 3.6 km || 
|-id=735 bgcolor=#E9E9E9
| 170735 ||  || — || January 27, 2004 || Anderson Mesa || LONEOS || — || align=right | 3.6 km || 
|-id=736 bgcolor=#E9E9E9
| 170736 ||  || — || January 27, 2004 || Anderson Mesa || LONEOS || — || align=right | 2.6 km || 
|-id=737 bgcolor=#E9E9E9
| 170737 ||  || — || January 28, 2004 || Socorro || LINEAR || — || align=right | 2.2 km || 
|-id=738 bgcolor=#d6d6d6
| 170738 ||  || — || January 27, 2004 || Kitt Peak || Spacewatch || — || align=right | 4.3 km || 
|-id=739 bgcolor=#d6d6d6
| 170739 ||  || — || January 23, 2004 || Socorro || LINEAR || — || align=right | 4.1 km || 
|-id=740 bgcolor=#fefefe
| 170740 ||  || — || January 24, 2004 || Socorro || LINEAR || NYS || align=right | 1.3 km || 
|-id=741 bgcolor=#d6d6d6
| 170741 ||  || — || January 24, 2004 || Socorro || LINEAR || — || align=right | 4.9 km || 
|-id=742 bgcolor=#E9E9E9
| 170742 ||  || — || January 26, 2004 || Anderson Mesa || LONEOS || — || align=right | 4.8 km || 
|-id=743 bgcolor=#E9E9E9
| 170743 ||  || — || January 27, 2004 || Kitt Peak || Spacewatch || HOF || align=right | 5.0 km || 
|-id=744 bgcolor=#E9E9E9
| 170744 ||  || — || January 28, 2004 || Catalina || CSS || — || align=right | 1.9 km || 
|-id=745 bgcolor=#E9E9E9
| 170745 ||  || — || January 28, 2004 || Catalina || CSS || — || align=right | 3.6 km || 
|-id=746 bgcolor=#d6d6d6
| 170746 ||  || — || January 28, 2004 || Catalina || CSS || — || align=right | 3.4 km || 
|-id=747 bgcolor=#d6d6d6
| 170747 ||  || — || January 16, 2004 || Kitt Peak || Spacewatch || KOR || align=right | 1.6 km || 
|-id=748 bgcolor=#d6d6d6
| 170748 ||  || — || January 16, 2004 || Kitt Peak || Spacewatch || KOR || align=right | 2.3 km || 
|-id=749 bgcolor=#E9E9E9
| 170749 ||  || — || January 19, 2004 || Kitt Peak || Spacewatch || — || align=right | 3.7 km || 
|-id=750 bgcolor=#E9E9E9
| 170750 ||  || — || January 16, 2004 || Palomar || NEAT || — || align=right | 4.9 km || 
|-id=751 bgcolor=#d6d6d6
| 170751 ||  || — || January 31, 2004 || Kitt Peak || Spacewatch || KOR || align=right | 2.3 km || 
|-id=752 bgcolor=#fefefe
| 170752 ||  || — || February 11, 2004 || Desert Eagle || W. K. Y. Yeung || NYS || align=right | 1.6 km || 
|-id=753 bgcolor=#E9E9E9
| 170753 ||  || — || February 10, 2004 || Palomar || NEAT || AGN || align=right | 2.0 km || 
|-id=754 bgcolor=#d6d6d6
| 170754 ||  || — || February 10, 2004 || Palomar || NEAT || EOS || align=right | 6.3 km || 
|-id=755 bgcolor=#E9E9E9
| 170755 ||  || — || February 11, 2004 || Kitt Peak || Spacewatch || — || align=right | 1.9 km || 
|-id=756 bgcolor=#E9E9E9
| 170756 ||  || — || February 10, 2004 || Palomar || NEAT || MRX || align=right | 1.6 km || 
|-id=757 bgcolor=#d6d6d6
| 170757 ||  || — || February 11, 2004 || Kitt Peak || Spacewatch || KOR || align=right | 1.7 km || 
|-id=758 bgcolor=#d6d6d6
| 170758 ||  || — || February 12, 2004 || Palomar || NEAT || BRA || align=right | 2.4 km || 
|-id=759 bgcolor=#d6d6d6
| 170759 ||  || — || February 12, 2004 || Palomar || NEAT || — || align=right | 4.6 km || 
|-id=760 bgcolor=#d6d6d6
| 170760 ||  || — || February 11, 2004 || Kitt Peak || Spacewatch || CHA || align=right | 2.8 km || 
|-id=761 bgcolor=#d6d6d6
| 170761 ||  || — || February 11, 2004 || Palomar || NEAT || EOS || align=right | 3.6 km || 
|-id=762 bgcolor=#E9E9E9
| 170762 ||  || — || February 10, 2004 || Palomar || NEAT || — || align=right | 1.5 km || 
|-id=763 bgcolor=#d6d6d6
| 170763 ||  || — || February 11, 2004 || Palomar || NEAT || URS || align=right | 5.7 km || 
|-id=764 bgcolor=#E9E9E9
| 170764 ||  || — || February 15, 2004 || Socorro || LINEAR || — || align=right | 4.4 km || 
|-id=765 bgcolor=#d6d6d6
| 170765 ||  || — || February 11, 2004 || Kitt Peak || Spacewatch || EOS || align=right | 3.6 km || 
|-id=766 bgcolor=#d6d6d6
| 170766 ||  || — || February 15, 2004 || Socorro || LINEAR || — || align=right | 4.5 km || 
|-id=767 bgcolor=#d6d6d6
| 170767 ||  || — || February 10, 2004 || Palomar || NEAT || HYG || align=right | 5.4 km || 
|-id=768 bgcolor=#E9E9E9
| 170768 ||  || — || February 11, 2004 || Anderson Mesa || LONEOS || — || align=right | 3.8 km || 
|-id=769 bgcolor=#E9E9E9
| 170769 ||  || — || February 11, 2004 || Palomar || NEAT || — || align=right | 1.7 km || 
|-id=770 bgcolor=#d6d6d6
| 170770 ||  || — || February 15, 2004 || Socorro || LINEAR || — || align=right | 5.5 km || 
|-id=771 bgcolor=#d6d6d6
| 170771 ||  || — || February 15, 2004 || Socorro || LINEAR || — || align=right | 4.4 km || 
|-id=772 bgcolor=#d6d6d6
| 170772 ||  || — || February 15, 2004 || Palomar || NEAT || LIX || align=right | 6.7 km || 
|-id=773 bgcolor=#d6d6d6
| 170773 ||  || — || February 11, 2004 || Anderson Mesa || LONEOS || THM || align=right | 4.9 km || 
|-id=774 bgcolor=#E9E9E9
| 170774 ||  || — || February 11, 2004 || Palomar || NEAT || — || align=right | 1.5 km || 
|-id=775 bgcolor=#d6d6d6
| 170775 ||  || — || February 12, 2004 || Kitt Peak || Spacewatch || — || align=right | 3.7 km || 
|-id=776 bgcolor=#d6d6d6
| 170776 ||  || — || February 12, 2004 || Palomar || NEAT || — || align=right | 4.5 km || 
|-id=777 bgcolor=#d6d6d6
| 170777 ||  || — || February 14, 2004 || Kitt Peak || Spacewatch || HYG || align=right | 5.0 km || 
|-id=778 bgcolor=#E9E9E9
| 170778 ||  || — || February 10, 2004 || Socorro || LINEAR || JUN || align=right | 2.0 km || 
|-id=779 bgcolor=#d6d6d6
| 170779 ||  || — || February 14, 2004 || Socorro || LINEAR || — || align=right | 3.1 km || 
|-id=780 bgcolor=#E9E9E9
| 170780 ||  || — || February 12, 2004 || Palomar || NEAT || — || align=right | 2.8 km || 
|-id=781 bgcolor=#d6d6d6
| 170781 ||  || — || February 12, 2004 || Palomar || NEAT || — || align=right | 3.4 km || 
|-id=782 bgcolor=#d6d6d6
| 170782 ||  || — || February 13, 2004 || Palomar || NEAT || TIR || align=right | 4.0 km || 
|-id=783 bgcolor=#d6d6d6
| 170783 ||  || — || February 14, 2004 || Palomar || NEAT || — || align=right | 4.3 km || 
|-id=784 bgcolor=#d6d6d6
| 170784 ||  || — || February 14, 2004 || Palomar || NEAT || — || align=right | 3.2 km || 
|-id=785 bgcolor=#d6d6d6
| 170785 ||  || — || February 11, 2004 || Kitt Peak || Spacewatch || — || align=right | 5.1 km || 
|-id=786 bgcolor=#E9E9E9
| 170786 ||  || — || February 13, 2004 || Anderson Mesa || LONEOS || — || align=right | 2.7 km || 
|-id=787 bgcolor=#d6d6d6
| 170787 ||  || — || February 11, 2004 || Kitt Peak || Spacewatch || — || align=right | 5.1 km || 
|-id=788 bgcolor=#d6d6d6
| 170788 ||  || — || February 12, 2004 || Kitt Peak || Spacewatch || — || align=right | 3.4 km || 
|-id=789 bgcolor=#E9E9E9
| 170789 ||  || — || February 18, 2004 || Goodricke-Pigott || Goodricke-Pigott Obs. || — || align=right | 3.6 km || 
|-id=790 bgcolor=#d6d6d6
| 170790 ||  || — || February 16, 2004 || Socorro || LINEAR || MEL || align=right | 2.8 km || 
|-id=791 bgcolor=#E9E9E9
| 170791 ||  || — || February 16, 2004 || Kitt Peak || Spacewatch || — || align=right | 1.7 km || 
|-id=792 bgcolor=#d6d6d6
| 170792 ||  || — || February 18, 2004 || Desert Eagle || W. K. Y. Yeung || 628 || align=right | 3.4 km || 
|-id=793 bgcolor=#d6d6d6
| 170793 ||  || — || February 17, 2004 || Socorro || LINEAR || KOR || align=right | 2.5 km || 
|-id=794 bgcolor=#E9E9E9
| 170794 ||  || — || February 17, 2004 || Haleakala || NEAT || — || align=right | 4.4 km || 
|-id=795 bgcolor=#d6d6d6
| 170795 ||  || — || February 16, 2004 || Catalina || CSS || — || align=right | 5.1 km || 
|-id=796 bgcolor=#E9E9E9
| 170796 ||  || — || February 17, 2004 || Catalina || CSS || — || align=right | 3.3 km || 
|-id=797 bgcolor=#E9E9E9
| 170797 ||  || — || February 17, 2004 || Catalina || CSS || PAE || align=right | 5.5 km || 
|-id=798 bgcolor=#d6d6d6
| 170798 ||  || — || February 17, 2004 || Catalina || CSS || — || align=right | 5.4 km || 
|-id=799 bgcolor=#d6d6d6
| 170799 ||  || — || February 19, 2004 || Socorro || LINEAR || — || align=right | 4.8 km || 
|-id=800 bgcolor=#d6d6d6
| 170800 ||  || — || February 16, 2004 || Kitt Peak || Spacewatch || — || align=right | 4.6 km || 
|}

170801–170900 

|-bgcolor=#d6d6d6
| 170801 ||  || — || February 17, 2004 || Kitt Peak || Spacewatch || KOR || align=right | 2.6 km || 
|-id=802 bgcolor=#d6d6d6
| 170802 ||  || — || February 17, 2004 || Kitt Peak || Spacewatch || KAR || align=right | 1.9 km || 
|-id=803 bgcolor=#d6d6d6
| 170803 ||  || — || February 17, 2004 || Socorro || LINEAR || — || align=right | 6.5 km || 
|-id=804 bgcolor=#d6d6d6
| 170804 ||  || — || February 17, 2004 || Socorro || LINEAR || — || align=right | 3.5 km || 
|-id=805 bgcolor=#d6d6d6
| 170805 ||  || — || February 19, 2004 || Socorro || LINEAR || EOS || align=right | 3.2 km || 
|-id=806 bgcolor=#d6d6d6
| 170806 ||  || — || February 19, 2004 || Socorro || LINEAR || — || align=right | 5.4 km || 
|-id=807 bgcolor=#d6d6d6
| 170807 ||  || — || February 19, 2004 || Socorro || LINEAR || — || align=right | 5.5 km || 
|-id=808 bgcolor=#d6d6d6
| 170808 ||  || — || February 19, 2004 || Haleakala || NEAT || EOS || align=right | 3.5 km || 
|-id=809 bgcolor=#d6d6d6
| 170809 ||  || — || February 19, 2004 || Socorro || LINEAR || — || align=right | 4.3 km || 
|-id=810 bgcolor=#d6d6d6
| 170810 ||  || — || February 23, 2004 || Socorro || LINEAR || — || align=right | 4.9 km || 
|-id=811 bgcolor=#d6d6d6
| 170811 ||  || — || February 23, 2004 || Socorro || LINEAR || EOS || align=right | 3.3 km || 
|-id=812 bgcolor=#d6d6d6
| 170812 ||  || — || February 23, 2004 || Socorro || LINEAR || KOR || align=right | 2.3 km || 
|-id=813 bgcolor=#d6d6d6
| 170813 ||  || — || February 25, 2004 || Wise || D. Polishook || — || align=right | 6.0 km || 
|-id=814 bgcolor=#E9E9E9
| 170814 ||  || — || February 17, 2004 || Kitt Peak || Spacewatch || — || align=right | 2.5 km || 
|-id=815 bgcolor=#d6d6d6
| 170815 ||  || — || March 12, 2004 || Palomar || NEAT || — || align=right | 3.9 km || 
|-id=816 bgcolor=#d6d6d6
| 170816 ||  || — || March 10, 2004 || Palomar || NEAT || — || align=right | 5.0 km || 
|-id=817 bgcolor=#d6d6d6
| 170817 ||  || — || March 11, 2004 || Palomar || NEAT || — || align=right | 3.9 km || 
|-id=818 bgcolor=#d6d6d6
| 170818 ||  || — || March 11, 2004 || Palomar || NEAT || — || align=right | 5.6 km || 
|-id=819 bgcolor=#d6d6d6
| 170819 ||  || — || March 15, 2004 || Catalina || CSS || THM || align=right | 4.6 km || 
|-id=820 bgcolor=#d6d6d6
| 170820 ||  || — || March 11, 2004 || Palomar || NEAT || THM || align=right | 3.7 km || 
|-id=821 bgcolor=#d6d6d6
| 170821 ||  || — || March 11, 2004 || Palomar || NEAT || — || align=right | 3.4 km || 
|-id=822 bgcolor=#d6d6d6
| 170822 ||  || — || March 11, 2004 || Palomar || NEAT || — || align=right | 6.4 km || 
|-id=823 bgcolor=#E9E9E9
| 170823 ||  || — || March 11, 2004 || Palomar || NEAT || MRX || align=right | 2.1 km || 
|-id=824 bgcolor=#d6d6d6
| 170824 ||  || — || March 12, 2004 || Palomar || NEAT || — || align=right | 3.5 km || 
|-id=825 bgcolor=#d6d6d6
| 170825 ||  || — || March 13, 2004 || Palomar || NEAT || — || align=right | 5.1 km || 
|-id=826 bgcolor=#d6d6d6
| 170826 ||  || — || March 15, 2004 || Catalina || CSS || — || align=right | 4.2 km || 
|-id=827 bgcolor=#d6d6d6
| 170827 ||  || — || March 15, 2004 || Kitt Peak || Spacewatch || — || align=right | 3.9 km || 
|-id=828 bgcolor=#d6d6d6
| 170828 ||  || — || March 12, 2004 || Palomar || NEAT || — || align=right | 3.0 km || 
|-id=829 bgcolor=#d6d6d6
| 170829 ||  || — || March 13, 2004 || Palomar || NEAT || HYG || align=right | 5.0 km || 
|-id=830 bgcolor=#d6d6d6
| 170830 ||  || — || March 14, 2004 || Catalina || CSS || — || align=right | 3.9 km || 
|-id=831 bgcolor=#d6d6d6
| 170831 ||  || — || March 15, 2004 || Kitt Peak || Spacewatch || — || align=right | 4.5 km || 
|-id=832 bgcolor=#d6d6d6
| 170832 ||  || — || March 14, 2004 || Palomar || NEAT || — || align=right | 4.6 km || 
|-id=833 bgcolor=#E9E9E9
| 170833 ||  || — || March 15, 2004 || Socorro || LINEAR || — || align=right | 1.5 km || 
|-id=834 bgcolor=#E9E9E9
| 170834 ||  || — || March 15, 2004 || Socorro || LINEAR || — || align=right | 3.6 km || 
|-id=835 bgcolor=#d6d6d6
| 170835 ||  || — || March 15, 2004 || Kitt Peak || Spacewatch || — || align=right | 3.6 km || 
|-id=836 bgcolor=#d6d6d6
| 170836 ||  || — || March 25, 2004 || Socorro || LINEAR || — || align=right | 7.2 km || 
|-id=837 bgcolor=#d6d6d6
| 170837 ||  || — || March 16, 2004 || Catalina || CSS || — || align=right | 4.4 km || 
|-id=838 bgcolor=#d6d6d6
| 170838 ||  || — || March 17, 2004 || Socorro || LINEAR || — || align=right | 4.2 km || 
|-id=839 bgcolor=#d6d6d6
| 170839 ||  || — || March 16, 2004 || Socorro || LINEAR || — || align=right | 5.1 km || 
|-id=840 bgcolor=#d6d6d6
| 170840 ||  || — || March 17, 2004 || Socorro || LINEAR || — || align=right | 5.5 km || 
|-id=841 bgcolor=#d6d6d6
| 170841 ||  || — || March 17, 2004 || Socorro || LINEAR || HYG || align=right | 3.8 km || 
|-id=842 bgcolor=#d6d6d6
| 170842 ||  || — || March 18, 2004 || Socorro || LINEAR || — || align=right | 4.4 km || 
|-id=843 bgcolor=#d6d6d6
| 170843 ||  || — || March 19, 2004 || Socorro || LINEAR || — || align=right | 4.7 km || 
|-id=844 bgcolor=#d6d6d6
| 170844 ||  || — || March 19, 2004 || Socorro || LINEAR || — || align=right | 4.3 km || 
|-id=845 bgcolor=#d6d6d6
| 170845 ||  || — || March 19, 2004 || Socorro || LINEAR || — || align=right | 4.3 km || 
|-id=846 bgcolor=#d6d6d6
| 170846 ||  || — || March 18, 2004 || Socorro || LINEAR || — || align=right | 3.6 km || 
|-id=847 bgcolor=#d6d6d6
| 170847 ||  || — || March 17, 2004 || Socorro || LINEAR || EOS || align=right | 4.3 km || 
|-id=848 bgcolor=#d6d6d6
| 170848 ||  || — || March 17, 2004 || Kitt Peak || Spacewatch || — || align=right | 6.0 km || 
|-id=849 bgcolor=#d6d6d6
| 170849 ||  || — || March 23, 2004 || Socorro || LINEAR || ALA || align=right | 6.9 km || 
|-id=850 bgcolor=#d6d6d6
| 170850 ||  || — || March 18, 2004 || Socorro || LINEAR || THM || align=right | 3.1 km || 
|-id=851 bgcolor=#d6d6d6
| 170851 ||  || — || March 23, 2004 || Kitt Peak || Spacewatch || — || align=right | 3.2 km || 
|-id=852 bgcolor=#d6d6d6
| 170852 ||  || — || March 24, 2004 || Anderson Mesa || LONEOS || — || align=right | 7.1 km || 
|-id=853 bgcolor=#d6d6d6
| 170853 ||  || — || March 24, 2004 || Anderson Mesa || LONEOS || — || align=right | 5.6 km || 
|-id=854 bgcolor=#d6d6d6
| 170854 ||  || — || March 23, 2004 || Socorro || LINEAR || EOS || align=right | 3.1 km || 
|-id=855 bgcolor=#d6d6d6
| 170855 ||  || — || March 23, 2004 || Socorro || LINEAR || — || align=right | 4.1 km || 
|-id=856 bgcolor=#d6d6d6
| 170856 ||  || — || March 22, 2004 || Socorro || LINEAR || KOR || align=right | 2.2 km || 
|-id=857 bgcolor=#d6d6d6
| 170857 ||  || — || March 23, 2004 || Socorro || LINEAR || — || align=right | 4.9 km || 
|-id=858 bgcolor=#d6d6d6
| 170858 ||  || — || March 23, 2004 || Socorro || LINEAR || — || align=right | 5.4 km || 
|-id=859 bgcolor=#d6d6d6
| 170859 ||  || — || March 22, 2004 || Anderson Mesa || LONEOS || LIX || align=right | 7.1 km || 
|-id=860 bgcolor=#E9E9E9
| 170860 ||  || — || March 27, 2004 || Anderson Mesa || LONEOS || — || align=right | 2.4 km || 
|-id=861 bgcolor=#d6d6d6
| 170861 ||  || — || April 11, 2004 || Catalina || CSS || MEL || align=right | 4.6 km || 
|-id=862 bgcolor=#d6d6d6
| 170862 ||  || — || April 12, 2004 || Anderson Mesa || LONEOS || — || align=right | 3.8 km || 
|-id=863 bgcolor=#d6d6d6
| 170863 ||  || — || April 12, 2004 || Palomar || NEAT || — || align=right | 4.3 km || 
|-id=864 bgcolor=#d6d6d6
| 170864 ||  || — || April 12, 2004 || Kitt Peak || Spacewatch || HYG || align=right | 3.9 km || 
|-id=865 bgcolor=#d6d6d6
| 170865 ||  || — || April 15, 2004 || Anderson Mesa || LONEOS || — || align=right | 3.9 km || 
|-id=866 bgcolor=#E9E9E9
| 170866 ||  || — || April 12, 2004 || Kitt Peak || Spacewatch || — || align=right | 3.5 km || 
|-id=867 bgcolor=#d6d6d6
| 170867 ||  || — || April 14, 2004 || Kitt Peak || Spacewatch || THB || align=right | 4.9 km || 
|-id=868 bgcolor=#d6d6d6
| 170868 ||  || — || April 12, 2004 || Siding Spring || SSS || IMH || align=right | 5.0 km || 
|-id=869 bgcolor=#d6d6d6
| 170869 ||  || — || April 12, 2004 || Kitt Peak || Spacewatch || — || align=right | 6.0 km || 
|-id=870 bgcolor=#d6d6d6
| 170870 ||  || — || April 17, 2004 || Anderson Mesa || LONEOS || — || align=right | 5.3 km || 
|-id=871 bgcolor=#d6d6d6
| 170871 ||  || — || April 17, 2004 || Needville || Needville Obs. || — || align=right | 3.4 km || 
|-id=872 bgcolor=#E9E9E9
| 170872 ||  || — || April 17, 2004 || Socorro || LINEAR || — || align=right | 2.9 km || 
|-id=873 bgcolor=#d6d6d6
| 170873 ||  || — || April 20, 2004 || Socorro || LINEAR || — || align=right | 5.0 km || 
|-id=874 bgcolor=#E9E9E9
| 170874 ||  || — || April 21, 2004 || Črni Vrh || Črni Vrh || — || align=right | 4.7 km || 
|-id=875 bgcolor=#d6d6d6
| 170875 ||  || — || April 25, 2004 || Reedy Creek || J. Broughton || EUP || align=right | 7.5 km || 
|-id=876 bgcolor=#E9E9E9
| 170876 ||  || — || April 23, 2004 || Kitt Peak || Spacewatch || — || align=right | 2.3 km || 
|-id=877 bgcolor=#d6d6d6
| 170877 ||  || — || May 12, 2004 || Siding Spring || SSS || — || align=right | 4.6 km || 
|-id=878 bgcolor=#E9E9E9
| 170878 ||  || — || June 11, 2004 || Palomar || NEAT || — || align=right | 3.6 km || 
|-id=879 bgcolor=#d6d6d6
| 170879 Verbeeckje ||  ||  || June 7, 2004 || Uccle || P. De Cat || — || align=right | 3.0 km || 
|-id=880 bgcolor=#FA8072
| 170880 ||  || — || August 10, 2004 || Socorro || LINEAR || — || align=right | 1.3 km || 
|-id=881 bgcolor=#fefefe
| 170881 ||  || — || August 11, 2004 || Socorro || LINEAR || — || align=right | 1.4 km || 
|-id=882 bgcolor=#fefefe
| 170882 ||  || — || August 12, 2004 || Socorro || LINEAR || — || align=right | 1.4 km || 
|-id=883 bgcolor=#fefefe
| 170883 ||  || — || August 26, 2004 || Socorro || LINEAR || H || align=right | 1.0 km || 
|-id=884 bgcolor=#d6d6d6
| 170884 ||  || — || September 8, 2004 || Socorro || LINEAR || — || align=right | 6.5 km || 
|-id=885 bgcolor=#fefefe
| 170885 ||  || — || September 8, 2004 || Palomar || NEAT || V || align=right | 1.2 km || 
|-id=886 bgcolor=#fefefe
| 170886 ||  || — || September 12, 2004 || Socorro || LINEAR || H || align=right | 1.1 km || 
|-id=887 bgcolor=#fefefe
| 170887 ||  || — || September 12, 2004 || Socorro || LINEAR || H || align=right | 1.3 km || 
|-id=888 bgcolor=#fefefe
| 170888 ||  || — || September 12, 2004 || Socorro || LINEAR || H || align=right | 1.4 km || 
|-id=889 bgcolor=#fefefe
| 170889 ||  || — || September 14, 2004 || Palomar || NEAT || H || align=right | 1.2 km || 
|-id=890 bgcolor=#fefefe
| 170890 ||  || — || September 18, 2004 || Socorro || LINEAR || — || align=right | 1.3 km || 
|-id=891 bgcolor=#FFC2E0
| 170891 ||  || — || October 10, 2004 || Socorro || LINEAR || AMO +1km || align=right | 1.4 km || 
|-id=892 bgcolor=#fefefe
| 170892 ||  || — || October 4, 2004 || Kitt Peak || Spacewatch || — || align=right data-sort-value="0.67" | 670 m || 
|-id=893 bgcolor=#fefefe
| 170893 ||  || — || October 4, 2004 || Kitt Peak || Spacewatch || — || align=right | 1.2 km || 
|-id=894 bgcolor=#fefefe
| 170894 ||  || — || October 12, 2004 || Kitt Peak || Spacewatch || NYS || align=right | 2.2 km || 
|-id=895 bgcolor=#fefefe
| 170895 ||  || — || October 14, 2004 || Socorro || LINEAR || — || align=right | 1.2 km || 
|-id=896 bgcolor=#fefefe
| 170896 ||  || — || October 14, 2004 || Anderson Mesa || LONEOS || H || align=right data-sort-value="0.87" | 870 m || 
|-id=897 bgcolor=#fefefe
| 170897 ||  || — || October 21, 2004 || Socorro || LINEAR || — || align=right | 1.1 km || 
|-id=898 bgcolor=#fefefe
| 170898 ||  || — || November 4, 2004 || Anderson Mesa || LONEOS || — || align=right data-sort-value="0.84" | 840 m || 
|-id=899 bgcolor=#fefefe
| 170899 ||  || — || November 4, 2004 || Kitt Peak || Spacewatch || — || align=right data-sort-value="0.98" | 980 m || 
|-id=900 bgcolor=#fefefe
| 170900 Jendrassik ||  ||  || November 11, 2004 || Piszkéstető || K. Sárneczky || — || align=right data-sort-value="0.95" | 950 m || 
|}

170901–171000 

|-bgcolor=#fefefe
| 170901 ||  || — || November 10, 2004 || Kitt Peak || Spacewatch || FLO || align=right | 1.0 km || 
|-id=902 bgcolor=#fefefe
| 170902 ||  || — || November 11, 2004 || Kitt Peak || Spacewatch || — || align=right | 1.1 km || 
|-id=903 bgcolor=#FFC2E0
| 170903 ||  || — || November 18, 2004 || Socorro || LINEAR || APO +1kmPHA || align=right data-sort-value="0.86" | 860 m || 
|-id=904 bgcolor=#fefefe
| 170904 ||  || — || December 8, 2004 || Socorro || LINEAR || FLO || align=right data-sort-value="0.90" | 900 m || 
|-id=905 bgcolor=#fefefe
| 170905 ||  || — || December 9, 2004 || Catalina || CSS || EUT || align=right | 1.0 km || 
|-id=906 bgcolor=#fefefe
| 170906 Coluche ||  ||  || December 9, 2004 || Nogales || M. Ory || — || align=right | 1.2 km || 
|-id=907 bgcolor=#fefefe
| 170907 ||  || — || December 10, 2004 || Socorro || LINEAR || V || align=right | 1.2 km || 
|-id=908 bgcolor=#FA8072
| 170908 ||  || — || December 13, 2004 || Kitt Peak || Spacewatch || — || align=right | 1.4 km || 
|-id=909 bgcolor=#fefefe
| 170909 Bobmasterson ||  ||  || December 12, 2004 || Jarnac || T. Glinos, D. H. Levy || — || align=right | 1.3 km || 
|-id=910 bgcolor=#fefefe
| 170910 Brandonsanderson ||  ||  || December 9, 2004 || Catalina || CSS || — || align=right | 1.2 km || 
|-id=911 bgcolor=#fefefe
| 170911 ||  || — || December 11, 2004 || Kitt Peak || Spacewatch || — || align=right | 1.4 km || 
|-id=912 bgcolor=#fefefe
| 170912 ||  || — || December 11, 2004 || Socorro || LINEAR || V || align=right data-sort-value="0.99" | 990 m || 
|-id=913 bgcolor=#fefefe
| 170913 ||  || — || December 14, 2004 || Socorro || LINEAR || — || align=right | 1.3 km || 
|-id=914 bgcolor=#fefefe
| 170914 ||  || — || December 9, 2004 || Kitt Peak || Spacewatch || slow || align=right | 1.4 km || 
|-id=915 bgcolor=#fefefe
| 170915 ||  || — || December 14, 2004 || Socorro || LINEAR || — || align=right | 1.4 km || 
|-id=916 bgcolor=#E9E9E9
| 170916 ||  || — || December 15, 2004 || Catalina || CSS || JUN || align=right | 2.3 km || 
|-id=917 bgcolor=#E9E9E9
| 170917 ||  || — || December 11, 2004 || Catalina || CSS || — || align=right | 6.0 km || 
|-id=918 bgcolor=#E9E9E9
| 170918 ||  || — || December 13, 2004 || Kitt Peak || Spacewatch || — || align=right | 2.7 km || 
|-id=919 bgcolor=#fefefe
| 170919 ||  || — || December 15, 2004 || Socorro || LINEAR || — || align=right | 1.3 km || 
|-id=920 bgcolor=#fefefe
| 170920 ||  || — || December 15, 2004 || Kitt Peak || Spacewatch || — || align=right | 1.3 km || 
|-id=921 bgcolor=#fefefe
| 170921 ||  || — || December 16, 2004 || Kitt Peak || Spacewatch || — || align=right | 1.3 km || 
|-id=922 bgcolor=#fefefe
| 170922 ||  || — || December 16, 2004 || Kitt Peak || Spacewatch || LCI || align=right | 1.6 km || 
|-id=923 bgcolor=#fefefe
| 170923 ||  || — || December 18, 2004 || Mount Lemmon || Mount Lemmon Survey || PHO || align=right | 1.9 km || 
|-id=924 bgcolor=#fefefe
| 170924 ||  || — || December 18, 2004 || Mount Lemmon || Mount Lemmon Survey || — || align=right | 2.4 km || 
|-id=925 bgcolor=#fefefe
| 170925 ||  || — || December 18, 2004 || Mount Lemmon || Mount Lemmon Survey || — || align=right | 1.1 km || 
|-id=926 bgcolor=#fefefe
| 170926 ||  || — || December 19, 2004 || Mount Lemmon || Mount Lemmon Survey || MAS || align=right data-sort-value="0.93" | 930 m || 
|-id=927 bgcolor=#fefefe
| 170927 Dgebessire ||  ||  || January 5, 2005 || Vicques || M. Ory || — || align=right | 1.5 km || 
|-id=928 bgcolor=#fefefe
| 170928 ||  || — || January 6, 2005 || Catalina || CSS || FLO || align=right data-sort-value="0.97" | 970 m || 
|-id=929 bgcolor=#fefefe
| 170929 ||  || — || January 6, 2005 || Catalina || CSS || NYS || align=right | 1.2 km || 
|-id=930 bgcolor=#E9E9E9
| 170930 ||  || — || January 7, 2005 || Catalina || CSS || — || align=right | 2.5 km || 
|-id=931 bgcolor=#fefefe
| 170931 ||  || — || January 7, 2005 || Catalina || CSS || V || align=right | 1.0 km || 
|-id=932 bgcolor=#fefefe
| 170932 ||  || — || January 7, 2005 || Socorro || LINEAR || — || align=right data-sort-value="0.94" | 940 m || 
|-id=933 bgcolor=#fefefe
| 170933 ||  || — || January 6, 2005 || Socorro || LINEAR || NYS || align=right data-sort-value="0.96" | 960 m || 
|-id=934 bgcolor=#fefefe
| 170934 ||  || — || January 7, 2005 || Socorro || LINEAR || NYS || align=right | 1.1 km || 
|-id=935 bgcolor=#fefefe
| 170935 ||  || — || January 7, 2005 || Catalina || CSS || FLO || align=right | 1.2 km || 
|-id=936 bgcolor=#fefefe
| 170936 ||  || — || January 11, 2005 || Socorro || LINEAR || NYS || align=right | 1.3 km || 
|-id=937 bgcolor=#fefefe
| 170937 ||  || — || January 11, 2005 || Socorro || LINEAR || — || align=right | 1.6 km || 
|-id=938 bgcolor=#fefefe
| 170938 ||  || — || January 13, 2005 || Socorro || LINEAR || FLO || align=right | 1.1 km || 
|-id=939 bgcolor=#E9E9E9
| 170939 ||  || — || January 13, 2005 || Kitt Peak || Spacewatch || — || align=right | 2.3 km || 
|-id=940 bgcolor=#fefefe
| 170940 ||  || — || January 15, 2005 || Kitt Peak || Spacewatch || — || align=right data-sort-value="0.97" | 970 m || 
|-id=941 bgcolor=#fefefe
| 170941 ||  || — || January 13, 2005 || Kitt Peak || Spacewatch || NYS || align=right data-sort-value="0.81" | 810 m || 
|-id=942 bgcolor=#fefefe
| 170942 ||  || — || January 13, 2005 || Catalina || CSS || — || align=right | 1.4 km || 
|-id=943 bgcolor=#fefefe
| 170943 ||  || — || January 13, 2005 || Kitt Peak || Spacewatch || ERI || align=right | 2.1 km || 
|-id=944 bgcolor=#fefefe
| 170944 ||  || — || January 15, 2005 || Socorro || LINEAR || MAS || align=right | 1.4 km || 
|-id=945 bgcolor=#fefefe
| 170945 ||  || — || January 13, 2005 || Catalina || CSS || — || align=right | 1.2 km || 
|-id=946 bgcolor=#E9E9E9
| 170946 ||  || — || January 16, 2005 || Socorro || LINEAR || BRU || align=right | 5.0 km || 
|-id=947 bgcolor=#d6d6d6
| 170947 ||  || — || January 16, 2005 || Anderson Mesa || LONEOS || HYG || align=right | 4.9 km || 
|-id=948 bgcolor=#E9E9E9
| 170948 ||  || — || January 16, 2005 || Kitt Peak || Spacewatch || — || align=right | 1.6 km || 
|-id=949 bgcolor=#fefefe
| 170949 ||  || — || January 16, 2005 || Socorro || LINEAR || — || align=right data-sort-value="0.77" | 770 m || 
|-id=950 bgcolor=#fefefe
| 170950 ||  || — || January 16, 2005 || Socorro || LINEAR || NYS || align=right | 1.1 km || 
|-id=951 bgcolor=#fefefe
| 170951 ||  || — || January 16, 2005 || Kitt Peak || Spacewatch || — || align=right | 1.4 km || 
|-id=952 bgcolor=#d6d6d6
| 170952 ||  || — || January 17, 2005 || Kitt Peak || Spacewatch || EOS || align=right | 5.4 km || 
|-id=953 bgcolor=#E9E9E9
| 170953 ||  || — || January 17, 2005 || Kitt Peak || Spacewatch || — || align=right | 2.2 km || 
|-id=954 bgcolor=#E9E9E9
| 170954 ||  || — || January 16, 2005 || Socorro || LINEAR || GER || align=right | 2.7 km || 
|-id=955 bgcolor=#fefefe
| 170955 ||  || — || January 17, 2005 || Catalina || CSS || FLO || align=right data-sort-value="0.84" | 840 m || 
|-id=956 bgcolor=#fefefe
| 170956 ||  || — || January 17, 2005 || Catalina || CSS || MAS || align=right | 1.4 km || 
|-id=957 bgcolor=#fefefe
| 170957 ||  || — || January 17, 2005 || Socorro || LINEAR || — || align=right | 1.3 km || 
|-id=958 bgcolor=#fefefe
| 170958 ||  || — || January 31, 2005 || Palomar || NEAT || — || align=right | 1.7 km || 
|-id=959 bgcolor=#fefefe
| 170959 ||  || — || January 16, 2005 || Mauna Kea || C. Veillet || V || align=right data-sort-value="0.94" | 940 m || 
|-id=960 bgcolor=#E9E9E9
| 170960 ||  || — || February 1, 2005 || Catalina || CSS || — || align=right | 2.0 km || 
|-id=961 bgcolor=#fefefe
| 170961 ||  || — || February 1, 2005 || Kitt Peak || Spacewatch || NYS || align=right | 1.2 km || 
|-id=962 bgcolor=#fefefe
| 170962 ||  || — || February 1, 2005 || Kitt Peak || Spacewatch || ERI || align=right | 3.5 km || 
|-id=963 bgcolor=#fefefe
| 170963 ||  || — || February 1, 2005 || Kitt Peak || Spacewatch || MAS || align=right | 1.1 km || 
|-id=964 bgcolor=#fefefe
| 170964 ||  || — || February 1, 2005 || Palomar || NEAT || — || align=right data-sort-value="0.79" | 790 m || 
|-id=965 bgcolor=#fefefe
| 170965 ||  || — || February 1, 2005 || Catalina || CSS || — || align=right | 1.3 km || 
|-id=966 bgcolor=#E9E9E9
| 170966 ||  || — || February 2, 2005 || Kitt Peak || Spacewatch || JUN || align=right | 1.6 km || 
|-id=967 bgcolor=#fefefe
| 170967 ||  || — || February 2, 2005 || Socorro || LINEAR || — || align=right | 1.0 km || 
|-id=968 bgcolor=#fefefe
| 170968 ||  || — || February 2, 2005 || Catalina || CSS || — || align=right | 1.2 km || 
|-id=969 bgcolor=#fefefe
| 170969 ||  || — || February 2, 2005 || Catalina || CSS || NYS || align=right | 1.2 km || 
|-id=970 bgcolor=#fefefe
| 170970 ||  || — || February 2, 2005 || Catalina || CSS || NYS || align=right | 1.1 km || 
|-id=971 bgcolor=#fefefe
| 170971 ||  || — || February 3, 2005 || Socorro || LINEAR || NYS || align=right | 1.00 km || 
|-id=972 bgcolor=#fefefe
| 170972 ||  || — || February 1, 2005 || Catalina || CSS || FLO || align=right | 1.0 km || 
|-id=973 bgcolor=#fefefe
| 170973 ||  || — || February 4, 2005 || Altschwendt || Altschwendt Obs. || FLO || align=right data-sort-value="0.97" | 970 m || 
|-id=974 bgcolor=#fefefe
| 170974 ||  || — || February 4, 2005 || Gnosca || S. Sposetti || V || align=right | 1.0 km || 
|-id=975 bgcolor=#fefefe
| 170975 ||  || — || February 1, 2005 || Kitt Peak || Spacewatch || NYS || align=right | 1.2 km || 
|-id=976 bgcolor=#fefefe
| 170976 ||  || — || February 2, 2005 || Kitt Peak || Spacewatch || MAS || align=right | 1.2 km || 
|-id=977 bgcolor=#fefefe
| 170977 ||  || — || February 3, 2005 || Socorro || LINEAR || — || align=right | 1.2 km || 
|-id=978 bgcolor=#fefefe
| 170978 ||  || — || February 3, 2005 || Socorro || LINEAR || V || align=right | 1.2 km || 
|-id=979 bgcolor=#fefefe
| 170979 ||  || — || February 2, 2005 || Catalina || CSS || — || align=right | 1.2 km || 
|-id=980 bgcolor=#fefefe
| 170980 ||  || — || February 2, 2005 || Socorro || LINEAR || — || align=right | 1.5 km || 
|-id=981 bgcolor=#fefefe
| 170981 ||  || — || February 2, 2005 || Kitt Peak || Spacewatch || NYS || align=right | 1.2 km || 
|-id=982 bgcolor=#fefefe
| 170982 ||  || — || February 2, 2005 || Kitt Peak || Spacewatch || MAS || align=right | 1.0 km || 
|-id=983 bgcolor=#fefefe
| 170983 ||  || — || February 3, 2005 || Socorro || LINEAR || NYS || align=right data-sort-value="0.94" | 940 m || 
|-id=984 bgcolor=#fefefe
| 170984 ||  || — || February 3, 2005 || Socorro || LINEAR || V || align=right | 1.5 km || 
|-id=985 bgcolor=#fefefe
| 170985 ||  || — || February 2, 2005 || Socorro || LINEAR || NYS || align=right data-sort-value="0.85" | 850 m || 
|-id=986 bgcolor=#fefefe
| 170986 ||  || — || February 2, 2005 || Catalina || CSS || V || align=right | 1.3 km || 
|-id=987 bgcolor=#fefefe
| 170987 ||  || — || February 2, 2005 || Socorro || LINEAR || NYS || align=right | 1.0 km || 
|-id=988 bgcolor=#fefefe
| 170988 ||  || — || February 3, 2005 || Socorro || LINEAR || — || align=right | 1.5 km || 
|-id=989 bgcolor=#fefefe
| 170989 ||  || — || February 9, 2005 || Kitt Peak || Spacewatch || — || align=right | 1.6 km || 
|-id=990 bgcolor=#fefefe
| 170990 ||  || — || February 9, 2005 || Anderson Mesa || LONEOS || — || align=right | 1.4 km || 
|-id=991 bgcolor=#fefefe
| 170991 ||  || — || February 9, 2005 || Socorro || LINEAR || NYS || align=right | 1.3 km || 
|-id=992 bgcolor=#fefefe
| 170992 ||  || — || February 2, 2005 || Socorro || LINEAR || — || align=right | 1.4 km || 
|-id=993 bgcolor=#E9E9E9
| 170993 ||  || — || February 9, 2005 || Socorro || LINEAR || — || align=right | 2.9 km || 
|-id=994 bgcolor=#d6d6d6
| 170994 ||  || — || February 1, 2005 || Palomar || NEAT || — || align=right | 3.1 km || 
|-id=995 bgcolor=#fefefe
| 170995 Ritajoewright ||  ||  || March 3, 2005 || Jarnac || T. Glinos, D. H. Levy || — || align=right | 1.4 km || 
|-id=996 bgcolor=#d6d6d6
| 170996 ||  || — || March 1, 2005 || Goodricke-Pigott || R. A. Tucker || TRP || align=right | 4.6 km || 
|-id=997 bgcolor=#fefefe
| 170997 ||  || — || March 1, 2005 || Goodricke-Pigott || R. A. Tucker || NYS || align=right | 1.0 km || 
|-id=998 bgcolor=#fefefe
| 170998 ||  || — || March 2, 2005 || Kitt Peak || Spacewatch || — || align=right | 1.1 km || 
|-id=999 bgcolor=#E9E9E9
| 170999 ||  || — || March 2, 2005 || Kitt Peak || Spacewatch || NEM || align=right | 5.0 km || 
|-id=000 bgcolor=#fefefe
| 171000 ||  || — || March 3, 2005 || Kitt Peak || Spacewatch || NYS || align=right | 1.0 km || 
|}

References

External links 
 Discovery Circumstances: Numbered Minor Planets (170001)–(175000) (IAU Minor Planet Center)

0170